= List of Atlantic tropical storms (before 1950) =

This is a list of Atlantic tropical storms before 1950.

== Systems ==
=== 1850s ===
Name	Duration	Peak intensity		Areas affected	Damage (USD)	Deaths	Refs
Name	Duration	Wind speed	Pressure	Areas affected	Damage (USD)	Deaths	Refs
Three (Note: Climate researcher Michael Chenoweth, in his 2014 study, proposed the removal of this system from HURDAT.)	July 10, 1851	60 mph (95 km/h)	Not Specified	Lesser Antilles	Unknown	Unknown	
Five	September 13 – 16, 1851	60 mph (95 km/h)	Not Specified	None	None	None	
Six	October 16 – 19, 1851	70 mph (110 km/h)	Not Specified	New England	Unknown	Unknown	
One	August 5, 1853	60 mph (95 km/h)	Not Specified	None	None	None	
Two	August 10, 1853	45 mph (75 km/h)	Not Specified	Lesser Antilles	Unknown	Unknown	
Five	September 21, 1853	60 mph (95 km/h)	Not Specified	Mexico	Unknown	Unknown	
Seven	September 28, 1853	60 mph (95 km/h)	Not Specified	None	None	None	
Two	August 23, 1854	70 mph (110 km/h)	Not Specified	None	None	None	
Five	October 20 – 22, 1854	70 mph (110 km/h)	Not Specified	Bermuda	Unknown	Unknown	
Four	August 24 – 27, 1855	70 mph (110 km/h)	997 hPa (29.44 inHg)	Lesser Antilles, Hispaniola	Unknown	Unknown	
Three	August 19 – 21, 1856	60 mph (95 km/h)	Not Specified	Northeastern United States	Unknown	Unknown	
Four	August 21, 1856	60 mph (95 km/h)	Not Specified	Cuba	Unknown	Unknown	
One	June 30 – July 1, 1857	60 mph (95 km/h)	Not Specified	None	None	None	
Seven	October 16 – 18, 1859	70 mph (110 km/h)	Not Specified	The Bahamas, Florida	Unknown	Unknown	

=== 1860s ===
Name	Duration	Peak intensity		Areas affected	Damage (USD)	Deaths	Refs
Name	Duration	Wind speed	Pressure	Areas affected	Damage (USD)	Deaths	Refs
Five	September 18 – 21, 1860	70 mph (110 km/h)	Not Specified	None	None	None	
Six	October 6 – 9, 1861	70 mph (110 km/h)	Not Specified	None	None	None	
Seven	October 7, 1861	60 mph (95 km/h)	Not Specified	North Carolina	Unknown	Unknown	
One	June 15 – 17, 1862	60 mph (95 km/h)	Not Specified	None	None	None	
Four	October 6, 1862	60 mph (95 km/h)	Not Specified	Lesser Antilles	Unknown	Unknown	
Six	November 22 – 25, 1862	70 mph (110 km/h)	Not Specified	Panama	Unknown	Unknown	
Six	September 16 – 19, 1863	70 mph (110 km/h)	Not Specified	United States East Coast	Unknown	Unknown	
Seven	September 18 – 19, 1863	60 mph (95 km/h)	Not Specified	Mexico	Unknown	Unknown	
Eight	September 26 – 27, 1863	60 mph (95 km/h)	Not Specified	None	None	None	
Nine	September 29 – 30, 1863	70 mph (110 km/h)	Not Specified	United States Gulf Coast	Unknown	Unknown	
Two	July 25, 1864	70 mph (110 km/h)	Not Specified	None	None	None	
Four	September 5 – 8, 1864	60 mph (95 km/h)	Not Specified	None	Unknown	Unknown	
One	May 30, 1865	60 mph (95 km/h)	Not Specified	None	None	None	
Two	June 30 – July 1, 1865	60 mph (95 km/h)	Not Specified	Texas	Minimal	None	
Three	August 20 – 24, 1865	70 mph (110 km/h)	Not Specified	North Carolina	Unknown	Unknown	
Five	September 7, 1865	70 mph (110 km/h)	Not Specified	Louisiana	Unknown	Unknown	
Seven	October 29 – 30, 1866	70 mph (110 km/h)	Not Specified	United States East Coast	Heavy	Unknown	
Five	September 8, 1867	60 mph (95 km/h)	Not Specified	None	None	None	
Eight	October 9, 1867	45 mph (75 km/h)	Not Specified	Lesser Antilles	Unknown	Unknown	
Two	October 1 – 8, 1868	70 mph (110 km/h)	Not Specified	United States Gulf Coast	$5 thousand	Unknown	
Four	September 1 – 2, 1869	70 mph (110 km/h)	Not Specified	Bermuda	Unknown	Unknown	
Eight	September 14, 1869	70 mph (110 km/h)	Not Specified	None	None	None	
Nine	October 1, 1869	60 mph (95 km/h)	Not Specified	None	None	None	

=== 1870s ===
Name	Duration	Peak intensity		Areas affected	Damage (USD)	Deaths	Refs
Name	Duration	Wind speed	Pressure	Areas affected	Damage (USD)	Deaths	Refs
Three	September 1 – 2, 1870	70 mph (110 km/h)	Not Specified	None	None	None	
One	June 1 – 5, 1871	60 mph (95 km/h)	999 hPa (29.50 inHg)	Cuba, Florida, Louisiana, Texas, Oklahoma	Unknown	4	
Two	June 8 – 10, 1871	60 mph (95 km/h)	Not Specified	Mississippi, Louisiana, Texas	Unknown	1	
One	July 9 – 13, 1872	60 mph (95 km/h)	Not Specified	Louisiana, Mississippi, Tennessee	Unknown	None	
One	June 1 – 2, 1873	45 mph (75 km/h)	Not Specified	Florida, Georgia	Unknown	None	
Four	September 22 – 24, 1873	60 mph (95 km/h)	Not Specified	Florida	Minimal	None	
One	July 2 – 5, 1874	60 mph (95 km/h)	Not Specified	Texas	Unknown	None	
Four	September 4 – 7, 1874	60 mph (95 km/h)	Not Specified	Mexico, Texas	Unknown	1	
Five	September 8 – 11, 1874	60 mph (95 km/h)	Not Specified	None	None	None	
Four	September 24 – 28, 1875	60 mph (95 km/h)	Not Specified	Louisiana, Alabama, Florida, Georgia	Unknown	None	
Three	September 16 – 18, 1876	60 mph (95 km/h)	Not Specified	None	None	None	
One	August 1 – 5, 1877	70 mph (110 km/h)	Not Specified	United States East Coast, New Brunswick	Unknown	3	
Five	September 24 – 29, 1877	60 mph (95 km/h)	Not Specified	The Bahamas	Unknown	None	
Six	October 13 – 16, 1877	60 mph (95 km/h)	Not Specified	None	None	None	
Seven	October 24 – 28, 1877	60 mph (95 km/h)	Not Specified	Florida	Unknown	None	
Eight	November 28 – 29, 1877	60 mph (95 km/h)	Not Specified	The Bahamas, Atlantic Canada	Unknown	None	
One	July 1 – 3, 1878	45 mph (75 km/h)	Not Specified	Florida, North Carolina	Unknown	None	
Twelve	November 25 – December 2, 1878	70 mph (110 km/h)	Not Specified	Puerto Rico	Unknown	3	
Five	October 3 – 7, 1879	60 mph (95 km/h)	Not Specified	Cuba, Mississippi, Louisiana	Unknown	None	
Six	October 9 – 16, 1879	60 mph (95 km/h)	Not Specified	Leeward Islands, Cuba, Florida	Unknown	13	

=== 1880s ===
Name	Duration	Peak intensity		Areas affected	Damage (USD)	Deaths	Refs
Name	Duration	Wind speed	Pressure	Areas affected	Damage (USD)	Deaths	Refs
One	June 21–25, 1880	45 mph (75 km/h)	Unknown	Louisiana, Texas	0	Unknown	
Eleven	October 20–23, 1880	70 mph (110 km/h)	991 hPa (29.26 inHg)	Atlantic Canada	0	None	
One	August 1–4, 1881	60 mph (95 km/h)	Unknown	Mississippi	0	Unknown	
Two	August 11–14, 1881	45 mph (75 km/h)	Unknown	Texas	0	Unknown	
Seven	September 18–22, 1881	70 mph (110 km/h)	Unknown	None	None	None	
Three	September 14–16, 1882	60 mph (95 km/h)	Unknown	Louisiana, Texas	0	Unknown	
Four	September 21–24, 1882	60 mph (95 km/h)	1005 hPa (29.68 inHg)	East Coast of the United States	Unknown	Unknown	
Four	October 22–24, 1883	60 mph (95 km/h)	983 hPa (29.03 inHg)	None	None	None	
Three	August 29–31, 1885	60 mph (95 km/h)	Unknown	Louisiana, Florida, South Carolina	0	Unknown	
Eight	October 10–13, 1885	70 mph (110 km/h)	988 hPa (29.18 inHg)	Southeastern United States	0	Unknown	
Eleven	October 10–15, 1886	50 mph (85 km/h)	Unknown	None	None	None	
Twelve	October 21–26, 1886	70 mph (110 km/h)	≤992 hPa (29.29 inHg)	Haiti	0	Unknown	
One	May 15–18, 1887	70 mph (110 km/h)	≤997 hPa (29.44 inHg)	Newfoundland	0	None	
Two	May 17–21, 1887	60 mph (95 km/h)	≤1002 hPa (29.59 inHg)	Cuba, Bahamas	0	Unknown	
Three	June 12–14, 1887	40 mph (65 km/h)	1004 hPa (29.65 inHg)	Mississippi	"Some"	Unknown	
Five	July 30 – August 8, 1887	60 mph (95 km/h)	1001 hPa (29.56 inHg)	Haiti, Cuba	0	Unknown	
Eleven	October 6–9, 1887	60 mph (95 km/h)	Unknown	Mexico	0	Unknown	
Twelve	October 8–9, 1887	70 mph (110 km/h)	≤994 hPa (29.35 inHg)	Bahamas	0	Unknown	
Sixteen	October 29 – 31, 1887	70 mph (110 km/h)	993 hPa (29.32 inHg)	Southeastern United States	2	$7,000	
Nineteen	December 7–12, 1887	60 mph (95 km/h)	Unknown	Venezuela, Costa Rica	0	Unknown	
Two	July 4–6, 1888	60 mph (95 km/h)	≤1008 hPa (29.77 inHg)	Texas	0	Unknown	
Five	September 6–11, 1888	60 mph (95 km/h)	999 hPa (29.50 inHg)	Florida, East Coast of the United States	0	Unknown	
Eight	November 1–8, 1888	60 mph (95 km/h)	Unknown	None	None	None	
Seven	September 12–19, 1889	60 mph (95 km/h)	Unknown	None	None	None	
Eight	September 29 – October 6, 1889	70 mph (110 km/h)	Unknown	None	None	None	
Nine	October 5–7, 1889	60 mph (95 km/h)	≤1002 hPa (29.59 inHg)	Cuba, Florida, Nova Scotia	0	Unknown	

=== 1890s ===
Name	Duration	Peak intensity		Areas affected	Damage (USD)	Deaths	Refs
Name	Duration	Wind speed	Pressure	Areas affected	Damage (USD)	Deaths	Refs
One	May 27–29, 1890	60 mph (95 km/h)	Unknown	Cuba	4	Millions	
Two	August 18–28, 1890	60 mph (95 km/h)	Unknown	Cayman Islands, Louisiana, Mississippi	0	Unknown	
Seven	October 4–8, 1891	50 mph (85 km/h)	1004 hPa (29.65 inHg)	Cuba, Florida	2	Unknown	
Eight	October 7–9, 1891	45 mph (75 km/h)	1004 hPa (29.65 inHg)	Cuba, Florida, Atlantic Canada	0	Unknown	
Ten	November 3–6, 1891	60 mph (95 km/h)	Unknown	None	None	None	
One	June 9–16, 1892	50 mph (85 km/h)	≤1005 hPa (mbar)	Cuba, Florida, North Carolina	16	$1.5 million	
Four	September 8–13, 1892	60 mph (95 km/h)	Unknown	Louisiana, Mississippi	0	Unknown	
Six	September 25–27, 1892	60 mph (95 km/h)	Unknown	Mexico	0	Unknown	
Nine	October 21–29, 1892	50 mph (85 km/h)	Unknown	Florida	0	Unknown	
Eleven	October 20–23, 1893	60 mph (95 km/h)	Unknown	Cuba, Maryland	0	Unknown	
Twelve	November 5–9, 1893	70 mph (110 km/h)	Unknown	North Carolina	0	None	
One	June 6–9, 1894	40 mph (65 km/h)	Unknown	None	None	None	
Two	August 5–9, 1894	60 mph (95 km/h)	Unknown	Alabama, Mississippi	0	Unknown	
One	August 14–17, 1895	60 mph (95 km/h)	≤1009 hPa (mbar)	Alabama	0	Unknown	
Three	September 28 – October 7, 1895	60 mph (95 km/h)	≤989 hPa (mbar)	Yucatan Peninsula, Florida, Bahamas	56	Unknown	
Four	October 2–7, 1895	40 mph (65 km/h)	Unknown	Yucatan Peninsula, Texas	0	Unknown	
Six	October 13–17, 1895	40 mph (65 km/h)	Unknown	Florida	0	Unknown	
Seven	November 27–29, 1896	60 mph (95 km/h)	Unknown	Trinidad, Saint Vincent and the Grenadines, Barbados, Montserrat	75	$49 thousand	
Three	September 20–25, 1897	70 mph (110 km/h)	≤1003 hPa (mbar)	Florida, East Coast of the United States	0	Unknown	
Four	September 25–29, 1897	45 mph (75 km/h)	≤1010 hPa (mbar)	Cuba	0	None	
Six	October 23–29, 1897	65 mph (100 km/h)	≤993 hPa (mbar)	Bahamas, North Carolina, Virginia	6	Unknown	
Five	September 12–22, 1898	60 mph (95 km/h)	Unknown	Yucatan Peninsula, Louisiana, Arkansas, Missouri, Illinois	0	Unknown	
Six	September 20–28, 1898	60 mph (95 km/h)	Unknown	Nicaragua, Yucatan Peninsula, Texas	0	Unknown	
Eight	September 25–28, 1898	50 mph (85 km/h)	1008 hPa (29.77 inHg)	Cuba, Bahamas	0	Unknown	
Nine	October 2–14, 1898	70 mph (110 km/h)	Unknown	Cuba, Florida, Georgia	2	Extensive	
Ten	October 21–23, 1898	45 mph (75 km/h)	Unknown	Cuba, Bahamas	0	Unknown	
Eleven	October 27 – November 4, 1898	60 mph (95 km/h)	Unknown	Lesser Antilles, Yucatan Peninsula	0	Unknown	
One	June 26–27, 1899	40 mph (65 km/h)	Unknown	Texas	284	$9 million	
Six	October 2–6, 1899	60 mph (95 km/h)	Unknown	Florida, Georgia, East Coast of the United States	0	Unknown	
Seven	October 10–14, 1899	45 mph (75 km/h)	Unknown	None	None	None	
Eight	October 15 – 18, 1899	45 mph (75 km/h)	Unknown	Bahamas	0	None	
Ten	November 7–10, 1899	65 mph (100 km/h)	Unknown	Jamaica, Cuba	4	Unknown	

=== 1900s ===
Name	Duration	Peak intensity		Areas affected	Damage (USD)	Deaths	Refs
Name	Duration	Wind speed	Pressure	Areas affected	Damage (USD)	Deaths	Refs
Four	September 11 – 15, 1900	50 mph (85 km/h)	Not Specified	Yucatan Peninsula, United States Gulf Coast	Unknown	Unknown	
Five	October 4 – 10, 1900	70 mph (110 km/h)	Not Specified	Atlantic Canada	$100,000	1	
Six	October 10 – 15, 1900	45 mph (75 km/h)	Not Specified	United States East Coast, Atlantic Canada	Unknown	Unknown	
Seven	October 24 – 28, 1900	50 mph (85 km/h)	Not Specified	Hispaniola, Cuba, Bahamas, Florida	Unknown	Unknown	
One	June 11 – 15, 1901	40 mph (65 km/h)	Not Specified	Cuba, Southeastern United States	Unknown	Unknown	
Two	June 30 – July 10, 1901	70 mph (110 km/h)	Not Specified	Windward Islands, Hispaniola, Cuba, Texas	Unknown	14	
Five	August 18 – 22, 1901	50 mph (85 km/h)	Not Specified	Barbados, Venezuela	Unknown	Unknown	
Nine	September 12 – 17, 1901	60 mph (95 km/h)	Not Specified	None	None	None	
Ten	September 21 – 28, 1901	50 mph (85 km/h)	Not Specified	Cuba, Eastern United States, Atlantic Canada	Minor	Unknown	
Eleven	October 5 – 10, 1901	70 mph (110 km/h)	Not Specified	None	None	None	
Twelve	October 15 – 18, 1901	60 mph (95 km/h)	Not Specified	Cuba, The Bahamas	Unknown	Unknown	
One	June 12 – 16, 1902	60 mph (95 km/h)	Not Specified	Cuba, United States East Coast, Atlantic Canada	Minor	Unknown	
Five	November 1 – 6, 1902	70 mph (110 km/h)	Not Specified	None	None	None	
Five	September 19 – 26, 1903	60 mph (95 km/h)	Not Specified	The Bahamas	Unknown	Unknown	
Eight	October 5 – 10, 1903	70 mph (110 km/h)	Not Specified	United States East Coast	$10 million	26	
Nine	October 21 – 24, 1903	60 mph (95 km/h)	Not Specified	The Bahamas, Newfoundland	Unknown	Unknown	
Five	October 19 – 23, 1904	50 mph (85 km/h)	Not Specified	None	None	None	
Six	October 31 – November 4, 1904	50 mph (85 km/h)	Not Specified	Southeastern United States	Unknown	Unknown	
One	September 6 – 8, 1905	60 mph (95 km/h)	Not Specified	Lesser Antiles	Unknown	2	
Two	September 11 – 16, 1905	60 mph (95 km/h)	Not Specified	None	None	None	
Three	September 24 – 30, 1905	50 mph (85 km/h)	Not Specified	Yucatan Peninsula, Louisiana, Arkansas	Unknown	Unknown	
Five	October 5 – 10, 1905	50 mph (85 km/h)	Not Specified	Louisiana, Mississippi	Unknown	Unknown	
One	June 8 – 13, 1906	50 mph (85 km/h)	1002 hPa (29.59 inHg)	Cuba, Florida	Unknown	Unknown	
Three	August 22–25, 1906	70 mph (110 km/h)	1003 hPa (mbar)	None	None	None	
Seven	September 22 – October 1, 1906	70 mph (110 km/h)	994 hPa (mbar)	None	None	None	
Nine	October 14–17, 1906	50 mph (85 km/h)	1003 hPa (mbar)	Florida	0	None	
Ten	October 15–20, 1906	50 mph (85 km/h)	1005 hPa (mbar)	None	0	None	
One	June 24–29, 1907	65 mph (100 km/h)	1002 hPa (29.59 inHg)	Florida, Georgia	0	Unknown	
Two	September 18–22, 1907	45 mph (75 km/h)	1003 hPa (mbar)	Louisiana, Alabama	0	Unknown	
Three	September 27–29, 1907	50 mph (85 km/h)	1005 hPa (mbar)	Florida, Georgia, North Carolina	0	Unknown	
Four	October 17–19, 1907	50 mph (85 km/h)	1003 hPa (mbar)	None	None	None	
Five	November 6–12, 1907	45 mph (75 km/h)	Not Specified	None	None	None	
Four	July 29 – August 3, 1908	60 mph (95 km/h)	Not Specified	United States Gulf Coast	0	Unknown	
Five	August 30 – September 2, 1908	50 mph (85 km/h)	Unknown	North Carolina	0	None	
Seven	September 16–18, 1908	70 mph (110 km/h)	Not Specified	None	None	None	
Ten	October 20–23, 1908	40 mph (65 km/h)	Not Specified	South Carolina	0	None	

=== 1910s ===
Name	Duration	Peak intensity		Areas affected	Damage (USD)	Deaths	Refs
Name	Duration	Wind speed	Pressure	Areas affected	Damage (USD)	Deaths	Refs
One	June 15 – 19, 1909	45 mph (75 km/h)	Not Specified	Central America	Unknown	Unknown	
Three	June 26 – July 4, 1909	50 mph (85 km/h)	Not Specified	The Bahamas, Florida, Georgia	Unknown	Unknown	
Five	August 6 – 10, 1909	45 mph (75 km/h)	Not Specified	Mexico	Unknown	Unknown	
Seven	August 22 – 25, 1909	50 mph (85 km/h)	Not Specified	Louisiana, Texas, Mexico	Unknown	Unknown	
Eight	August 28 – 31, 1909	50 mph (85 km/h)	Not Specified	The Bahamas, Florida, Georgia	Unknown	Unknown	
Ten	September 24 – 29, 1909	60 mph (95 km/h)	Not Specified	Cuba, Florida	Unknown	Unknown	
One	August 23 – 26, 1910	45 mph (75 km/h)	Not Specified	The Caribbean, United States East Coast	Unknown	Unknown	
Two	August 26 – 31, 1910	45 mph (75 km/h)	Not Specified	Texas, Mexico	Unknown	Unknown	
One	August 4 – 12, 1911	60 mph (95 km/h)	Not Specified	Southeastern United States	Unknown	Unknown	
Five	September 15 – 20, 1911	65 mph (100 km/h)	Not Specified	None	None	None	
Six	October 26 – 31, 1911	50 mph (85 km/h)	Not Specified	The Bahamas, Cuba, Yucatan Peninsula, Florida	Unknown	Unknown	
One	June 7 – 17, 1912	70 mph (110 km/h)	Not Specified	Southeastern United States	Unknown	Unknown	
Two	July 12 – 17, 1912	50 mph (85 km/h)	Not Specified	Southeastern United States	Minimal	Unknown	
Three	September 2 – 6, 1912	50 mph (85 km/h)	Not Specified	Southeastern United States	Unknown	Unknown	
Two	August 14 – 16, 1913	45 mph (75 km/h)	Not Specified	None	None	None	
Three	August 26 – September 12, 1913	70 mph (110 km/h)	Not Specified	None	None	None	
One	September 15 – 19, 1914	70 mph (110 km/h)	Not Specified	The Bahamas, United States Gulf Coast	Unknown	Unknown	
Five	September 19 – 22, 1915	60 mph (95 km/h)	Not Specified	None	None	None	
One	May 13 – 16, 1916	60 mph (95 km/h)	990 hPa (29.23 inHg)	Cuba, United States East Coast	$150,000	Unknown	
Five	August 4 – 6, 1916	60 mph (95 km/h)	Not Specified	Mexico, Texas	Unknown	Unknown	
Nine	September 4 – 7, 1916	50 mph (85 km/h)	Not Specified	Georgia, North Carolina	Unknown	Unknown	
Twelve	October 2 – 5, 1916	60 mph (95 km/h)	Not Specified	Georgia	Unknown	Unknown	
Fifteen	November 11 – 15, 1916	70 mph (110 km/h)	Not Specified	Honduras	Unknown	Unknown	
One	July 6 – 14, 1917	50 mph (85 km/h)	Not Specified	Honduras, Belize, Mexico	Unknown	Unknown	
Two	August 6 – 10, 1917	70 mph (110 km/h)	Not Specified	Massachusetts, Atlantic Canada	Severe	41	
Four	August 31 – September 6, 1918	70 mph (110 km/h)	Not Specified	None	None	None	
Six	September 9 – 14, 1918	45 mph (75 km/h)	Not Specified	Haiti	Unknown	Unknown	
One	July 2 – 5, 1919	65 mph (100 km/h)	995 hPa (29.38 inHg)	United States Gulf Coast	$150,000	None	
Four	September 29 – October 2, 1919	45 mph (75 km/h)	Not Specified	Southeastern United States	Unknown	Unknown	
Five	November 10 - 15, 1919	70 mph (110 km/h)	Not Specified	None	None	None	

=== 1920s ===
Name	Duration	Peak intensity		Areas affected	Damage (USD)	Deaths	Refs
Name	Duration	Wind speed	Pressure	Areas affected	Damage (USD)	Deaths	Refs
Four	September 23–27, 1920	45 mph (75 km/h)	1009 hPa (mbar)	None	0	None	
Five	October 15–17, 1921	70 mph (110 km/h)	998 hPa (mbar)	Florida	0	None	
Seven	November 19–25, 1921	60 mph (95 km/h)	1003 hPa (mbar)	Bahamas, Cuba	0	None	
One	June 12 – 16, 1922	50 mph (85 km/h)	1003 hPa (mbar)	Nicaragua, Honduras, El Salvador, Mexico, Texas	100+	$2 million	
Five	October 12–17, 1922	50 mph (85 km/h)	1000 hPa (mbar)	Cuba, Alabama	0	Minimal	
One	June 22–28, 1923	60 mph (95 km/h)	999 hPa (29.50 inHg)	Louisiana, Mississippi, Alabama, East Coast of the United States	0	None	
Three	September 7–11, 1923	50 mph (85 km/h)	1000 hPa (mbar)	Cape Verde	0	None	
Seven	October 15–19, 1923	65 mph (100 km/h)	987 hPa (mbar)	Massachusetts, New Hampshire	0	None	
Eight	October 16–18, 1923	60 mph (95 km/h)	992 hPa (mbar)	Louisiana, Mississippi	4	Unknown	
Nine	October 24–26, 1923	45 mph (75 km/h)	1003 hPa (mbar)	None	0	None	
One	June 18–21, 1924	45 mph (75 km/h)	1005 hPa (mbar)	Belize, Mexico	0	None	
Two	July 28–30, 1924	65 mph (100 km/h)	999 hPa (29.50 inHg)	None	0	None	
Six	September 20–22, 1924	45 mph (75 km/h)	1005 hPa (mbar)	Cape Verde	0	None	
Seven	September 24 – October 3, 1924	50 mph (85 km/h)	1007 hPa (mbar)	None	0	None	
Eight	September 27–29, 1924	65 mph (100 km/h)	999 hPa (29.50 inHg)	Honduras, Florida	0	None	
Nine	October 11–15, 1924	60 mph (95 km/h)	1004 hPa (29.65 inHg)	Mexico	0	None	
Two	August 25–27, 1925	40 mph (65 km/h)	1009 hPa (mbar)	Florida, North Carolina	0	None	
Three	September 6–7, 1925	50 mph (85 km/h)	1002 hPa (29.59 inHg)	Mexico, Texas	0	None	
Four	November 27 – December 1, 1925	65 mph (100 km/h)	995 hPa (mbar)	Honduras, Cuba, Florida	73	$3 million	
Six	September 11–17, 1926	40 mph (65 km/h)	1004 hPa (29.65 inHg)	Cuba, Bahamas, Florida	0	Minimal	
Nine	October 3–5, 1926	40 mph (65 km/h)	1005 hPa (mbar)	Nicaragua, Belize, Guatemala	Unknown	Unknown	
Eleven	November 12–16, 1926	40 mph (65 km/h)	1007 hPa (mbar)	Cuba	Unknown	Unknown	
Five	September 30 – October 4, 1927	60 mph (95 km/h)	1008 hPa (29.77 inHg)	South Carolina, North Carolina	0	Very minor	
Six	October 16–19, 1927	45 mph (75 km/h)	999 hPa (29.50 inHg)	Honduras, Cuba, Bahamas	0	Minor	
Seven	October 30 – November 3, 1927	45 mph (75 km/h)	1011 hPa (mbar)	Cayman Islands, Cuba, Bahamas	0	Unknown	
Eight	November 19–21, 1927	60 mph (95 km/h)	999 hPa (29.50 inHg)	None	0	None	
Three	September 1–8, 1928	60 mph (95 km/h)	Unknown	Yucatán Peninsula, Tampico, Texas	Unknown	Unknown	
Five	September 8–10, 1928	70 mph (110 km/h)	≤1015 hPa (mbar)	None	0	None	
Three	September 25–27, 1929	60 mph (95 km/h)	1002 hPa (29.59 inHg)	None	0	None	
Four	October 15–19, 1929	70 mph (110 km/h)	999 hPa (29.50 inHg)	None	0	None	

=== 1930s ===
Name	Duration	Peak intensity		Areas affected	Damage (USD)	Deaths	Refs
Name	Duration	Wind speed	Pressure	Areas affected	Damage (USD)	Deaths	Refs
Three	October 18 – 21, 1930	70 mph (110 km/h)	992 hPa (29.29 inHg)	None	None	None	
One	June 24 – 28, 1931	50 mph (85 km/h)	1002 hPa (29.59 inHg)	Mexico, Texas	None	None	
Two	July 11–17, 1931	70 mph (110 km/h)	996 hPa (29.41 inHg)	Mexico, Texas, Louisiana, Mississippi, Arkansas, Oklahoma	None	Unknown	
Three	August 10–19, 1931	60 mph (95 km/h)	1002 hPa (29.59 inHg)	Windward Islands, Belize, Mexico	None	Unknown	
Four	August 16–21, 1931	40 mph (65 km/h)	Unknown	Lesser Antilles, New Jersey	1	Unknown	
Five	September 1–4, 1931	45 mph (75 km/h)	992 hPa (29.29 inHg)	Lesser Antilles, Hispaniola	30	Unknown	
Nine	October 13–16, 1931	45 mph (75 km/h)	1000 hPa (29.53 inHg)	Bahamas	None	None	
Ten	October 18–20, 1931	45 mph (75 km/h)	1004 hPa (29.65 inHg)	Bahamas, Cuba	None	Unknown	
Eleven	November 1–5, 1931	65 mph (100 km/h)	1011 hPa (29.85 inHg)	None	None	None	
Twelve	November 11–16, 1931	50 mph (85 km/h)	1003 hPa (29.62 inHg)	Nicaragua, Honduras, Belize, Mexico	None	Unknown	
Thirteen	November 22–25, 1931	65 mph (100 km/h)	998 hPa (29.47 inHg)	Lesser Antilles, Bahamas	None	Unknown	
One	May 5–11, 1932	65 mph (100 km/h)	995 hPa (29.38 inHg)	Hispaniola	None	None	
Five	September 4–7, 1932	70 mph (110 km/h)	992 hPa (29.29 inHg)	None	None	None	
Six	September 9–15, 1932	65 mph (100 km/h)	999 hPa (29.50 inHg)	Gulf Coast of the United States, East Coast of the United States, Atlantic Canada	None	$10 thousand	
Seven	September 16–22, 1932	65 mph (100 km/h)	994 hPa (29.35 inHg)	Atlantic Canada	None	Unknown	
Eight	September 18–21, 1932	65 mph (100 km/h)	998 hPa (29.47 inHg)	Louisiana, Ohio River Valley	None	Unknown	
Ten	September 28–30, 1932	45 mph (75 km/h)	1004 hPa (29.65 inHg)	None	None	None	
Eleven	October 7–15, 1932	70 mph (110 km/h)	990 hPa (29.23 inHg)	Belize, Mexico, Southeastern United States, Ohio River Valley	None	$30 thousand	
Twelve	October 8–12, 1932	60 mph (95 km/h)	997 hPa (29.44 inHg)	Bermuda	None	None	
Thirteen	October 18–21, 1932	70 mph (110 km/h)	999 hPa (29.50 inHg)	None	None	None	
One	May 14–19, 1933	50 mph (85 km/h)	1000 hPa (29.53 inHg)	Honduras, Mexico	None	None	
Three	July 14–27, 1933	50 mph (85 km/h)	999 hPa (29.50 inHg)	Jamaica, Belize, Yucatán Peninsula, Texas	None	$1.5 million	
Four	July 24–27, 1933	60 mph (95 km/h)	1008 hPa (29.77 inHg)	None	None	None	
Seven	August 14–21, 1933	45 mph (75 km/h)	1007 hPa (29.74 inHg)	Jamaica, Cayman Islands, Cuba	83	$2.5 million	
Nine	August 23–31, 1933	65 mph (100 km/h)	999 hPa (29.50 inHg)	None	None	None	
Ten	August 26–30, 1933	40 mph (65 km/h)	1002 hPa (29.59 inHg)	Mexico	None	None	
Sixteen	October 1–4, 1933	45 mph (75 km/h)	1012 hPa (29.88 inHg)	Bahamas	None	None	
Nineteen	October 26–29, 1933	70 mph (110 km/h)	990 hPa (29.23 inHg)	Atlantic Canada	None	Unknown	
Twenty	November 15–17, 1933	60 mph (95 km/h)	996 hPa (29.41 inHg)	Nicaragua	None	Unknown	
Four	August 20–23, 1934	40 mph (65 km/h)	Not Specified	Leeward Islands	None	None	
Six	September 1–4, 1934	50 mph (85 km/h)	1008 hPa (29.77 inHg)	North Carolina, Virginia, Maryland	None	Minor	
Eight	September 16–23, 1934	50 mph (85 km/h)	1010 hPa (29.83 inHg)	None	None	None	
Nine	September 18–25, 1934	60 mph (95 km/h)	1000 hPa (29.53 inHg)	None	None	None	
Eleven	October 4–6, 1934	60 mph (95 km/h)	1004 hPa (29.65 inHg)	Southeast United States	None	Minor	
Twelve	October 19–23, 1934	45 mph (75 km/h)	1000 hPa (29.53 inHg)	Jamaica, Cuba, Bahamas	None	None	
One	May 15–19, 1935	60 mph (95 km/h)	1003 hPa (29.62 inHg)	Hispaniola	None	Minimal	
Four	August 30 – September 2, 1935	60 mph (95 km/h)	1000 hPa (29.53 inHg)	Mexico	None	Minimal	
Eight	November 3–14, 1935	45 mph (75 km/h)	1000 hPa (29.53 inHg)	None	None	None	
One	June 12–17, 1936	45 mph (75 km/h)	996 hPa (29.41 inHg)	Mexico, Florida, Bahamas	3 indirect	Unknown	
Two	June 19–22, 1936	50 mph (85 km/h)	1000 hPa (29.53 inHg)	Mexico	None	None	
Four	July 26–28, 1936	45 mph (75 km/h)	1003 hPa (29.62 inHg)	Louisiana	None	Minor	
Six	August 4–9, 1936	50 mph (85 km/h)	1000 hPa (29.53 inHg)	Nova Scotia	None	None	
Seven	August 7–12, 1936	40 mph (65 km/h)	1008 hPa (29.77 inHg)	Louisiana, Mexico	None	Minor	
Nine	August 20–23, 1936	60 mph (95 km/h)	1002 hPa (29.59 inHg)	Bahamas, United States Gulf Coast	None	Minimal	
Twelve	September 7–8, 1936	40 mph (65 km/h)	1008 hPa (29.77 inHg)	None	None	None	
Fourteen	September 9–14, 1936	50 mph (85 km/h)	998 hPa (29.47 inHg)	Mexico, Texas	None	None	
Sixteen	October 9–11, 1936	40 mph (65 km/h)	1006 hPa (29.71 inHg)	Mexico	None	Unknown	
Seventeen	December 2–7, 1936	65 mph (100 km/h)	996 hPa (29.41 inHg)	None	None	None	
One	July 29 – August 2, 1937	70 mph (110 km/h)	996 hPa (29.41 inHg)	Florida, North Carolina, Nova Scotia	None	Unknown	
Two	August 2–9, 1937	65 mph (100 km/h)	1005 hPa (29.68 inHg)	Bahamas	None	None	
Three	August 24 – September 2, 1937	70 mph (110 km/h)	995 hPa (29.38 inHg)	Southeast United States	18	$62.5 million	
Five	September 10 – 12, 1937	70 mph (110 km/h)	988 hPa (29.18 inHg)	Nova Scotia	Unknown	None	
Seven	September 16–21, 1937	60 mph (95 km/h)	1002 hPa (29.59 inHg)	Florida	Unknown	2	
Nine	September 26–28, 1937	45 mph (75 km/h)	1010 hPa (29.83 inHg)	None	None	None	
Ten	October 2–4, 1937	45 mph (75 km/h)	1002 hPa (29.59 inHg)	Louisiana	None	Unknown	
Two	August 8–9, 1938	70 mph (110 km/h)	1002 hPa (29.59 inHg)	Greater Antilles	None	None	
Five	September 9–14, 1938	40 mph (65 km/h)	1009 hPa (29.80 inHg)	None	Unknown	None	
Seven	October 10–17, 1938	60 mph (95 km/h)	996 hPa (29.41 inHg)	Belize, Mexico, Florida, Texas	None	Minimal	
Eight	October 16–21, 1938	40 mph (65 km/h)	1004 hPa (29.65 inHg)	Bahamas, Atlantic Canada	4	$7 thousand	
Nine	November 6 – 10, 1938	70 mph (110 km/h)	1000 hPa (29.53 inHg)	Bahamas, Florida, Cuba	>$75,000	None	
One	June 12 – 18, 1939	65 mph (100 km/h)	999 hPa (29.50 inHg)	Mexico, Southeastern United States	Minor	1	
Three	August 15 – 19, 1939	65 mph (100 km/h)	1000 hPa (29.53 inHg)	None	None	None	
Four	September 23 – 27, 1939	50 mph (85 km/h)	1004 hPa (29.65 inHg)	Louisiana	Minimal	None	

=== 1940s ===
Name	Duration	Peak intensity		Areas affected	Damage (USD)	Deaths	Refs
Name	Duration	Wind speed	Pressure	Areas affected	Damage (USD)	Deaths	Refs
One	May 19 – 24, 1940	65 mph (100 km/h)	Not specified	None	None	None	
Six	September 18 – 25, 1940	50 mph (85 km/h)	1004 hPa (29.65 inHg)	Central America, Southern United States	$39,000	2	
Nine	October 24 – 26, 1940	45 mph (75 km/h)	Not specified	None	None	None	
One	September 11 – 16, 1941	60 mph (95 km/h)	1001 hPa (29.56 inHg)	Louisiana, Texas	Minor	None	
Six	October 15 – 22, 1941	50 mph (85 km/h)	1004 hPa (29.65 inHg)	The Bahamas, Cuba, Florida	Unknown	1	
One	August 3 – 5, 1942	60 mph (95 km/h)	Not specified	Belize, Mexico, Texas	Minor	None	
Five	September 15 – 23, 1942	50 mph (85 km/h)	Not specified	Lesser Antilles, Belize, Guatemala	Unknown	None	
Six	September 18 – 21, 1942	50 mph (85 km/h)	Not specified	Newfoundland	None	None	
Seven	September 27 – 29, 1942	50 mph (85 km/h)	Not specified	None	None	None	
Eight	October 1 – 4, 1942	70 mph (110 km/h)	Not specified	None	None	None	
Nine	October 10 – 11, 1942	50 mph (85 km/h)	1000 hPa (29.53 inHg)	North Carolina, Virginia	Unknown	1	
Ten	October 13 – 18, 1942	50 mph (85 km/h)	Not specified	Cuba, Bahamas	Unknown	Unknown	
Two	August 13 – 19, 1943	60 mph (95 km/h)	Not specified	None	None	None	
Five	September 13 – 15, 1943	50 mph (85 km/h)	Not specified	Bahamas, Atlantic Canada	Minor	None	
Seven	September 28 – October 1, 1943	65 mph (100 km/h)	997 hPa (29.44 inHg)	Virginia, Maryland, New Jersey	$20,000	1	
Eight	October 1 – 3, 1943	70 mph (110 km/h)	Not specified	Atlantic Canada	None	None	
Ten	October 20 – 26, 1943	45 mph (75 km/h)	Not specified	Belize	None	None	
Two	July 24 – 27, 1944	65 mph (100 km/h)	Not specified	Windward Islands, Haiti	None	None	
Five	August 18 – 23, 1944	60 mph (95 km/h)	Not specified	Mexico, Texas	Minimal	None	
Six	September 9 – 11, 1944	65 mph (100 km/h)	992 hPa (29.29 inHg)	Louisiana	$500	Unknown	
Ten	September 30 – October 2, 1944	50 mph (85 km/h)	Not specified	None	None	None	
Eleven	September 30 – October 3, 1944	45 mph (75 km/h)	Not specified	Barbados	None	None	
Fourteen	November 1 – 4, 1944	70 mph (110 km/h)	Not specified	None	None	None	
Two	July 19 – 22, 1945	40 mph (65 km/h)	Not specified	Texas, Louisiana	None	None	
Three	August 2 – 4, 1945	60 mph (95 km/h)	Not specified	Greater Antilles	None	None	
Four	August 17 – 21, 1945	70 mph (110 km/h)	Not specified	Greater Antilles, The Bahamas	None	None	
Six	August 29 – September 1, 1945	70 mph (110 km/h)	990 hPa (29.23 inHg)	Belize, Nicaragua, Honduras	Minimal	None	
Seven	September 3 – 6, 1945	40 mph (65 km/h)	Not specified	United States Gulf Coast	Minimal	None	
Eight	September 9 – 12, 1945	60 mph (95 km/h)	Not specified	None	None	None	
One	June 13 – 16, 1946	40 mph (65 km/h)	Not specified	Texas, Louisiana	None	None	
Three	August 25 – 26, 1946	40 mph (65 km/h)	Not specified	Mexico	None	None	
Five	October 1 – 3, 1946	60 mph (95 km/h)	Not specified	Azores	"Catastrophic"	None	
Seven	October 31 – November 3, 1946	45 mph (75 km/h)	Not specified	Florida	$1 million	None	
One (Note: The United States Air Force identified One by the next name on the Joint Army/Navy Phonetic Alphabet, which was Baker. The name was not known to the public until after the season.)	July 31 – August 2, 1947	50 mph (85 km/h)	Not specified	Texas, Mexico	$2 million	None	
Five (Note: The United States Air Force identified Five by the next name on the Joint Army/Navy Phonetic Alphabet, which was Fox. The name was not known to the public until after the season.)	September 7 – 9, 1947	60 mph (95 km/h)	Not specified	United States Gulf Coast	Minimal	None	
Six (Note: The United States Air Force identified Six by the next name on the Joint Army/Navy Phonetic Alphabet, which was How. The name was not known to the public until after the season.)	September 20 – 24, 1947	65 mph (100 km/h)	987 hPa (29.15 inHg)	Cayman Islands, Cuba, Florida, Georgia	$100,000	None	
Seven (Note: The United States Air Force identified Seven by the next name on the Joint Army/Navy Phonetic Alphabet, which was Item. The name was not known to the public until after the season.)	October 7 – 9, 1947	60 mph (95 km/h)	Not specified	Florida, Georgia	$100,000	None	
Eight	October 8 – 11, 1947	60 mph (95 km/h)	Not specified	None	None	None	
One	May 22 – 29, 1948	50 mph (85 km/h)	Not specified	Hispaniola, Bermuda	Unknown	80	
Two	July 7 – 11, 1948	40 mph (65 km/h)	Not specified	United States Gulf Coast	Minimal	None	
Four (Note: The United States Air Force identified Four by the next name on the Joint Army/Navy Phonetic Alphabet, which was Baker. The name was not known to the public until after the season.)	August 30 – September 1, 1948	60 mph (95 km/h)	1007 hPa (29.74 inHg)	Lesser Antilles	Minimal	None	
Seven	September 7 – 10, 1948	65 mph (100 km/h)	Not specified	None	None	None	
Three	August 30 – September 3, 1949	60 mph (95 km/h)	Not specified	Lesser Antilles	Unknown	7	
Five	September 3 – 5, 1949	60 mph (95 km/h)	Not specified	Louisiana, Mississippi	$50,000	None	
Six	September 5 – 12, 1949	65 mph (100 km/h)	996 hPa (29.41 inHg)	None	None	None	
Seven	September 11 – 14, 1949	50 mph (85 km/h)	Not specified	North Carolina, Virginia	Unknown	None	
Eight	September 13 – 17, 1949	60 mph (95 km/h)	Not specified	None	None	None	
Twelve	October 2 – 7, 1949	60 mph (95 km/h)	Not specified	None	None	None	
Fourteen	October 13 – 17, 1949	60 mph (95 km/h)	Not specified	None	None	None	
Fifteen	November 1 – 5, 1949	50 mph (85 km/h)	Not specified	None	None	None	
Sixteen	November 3 – 5, 1949	65 mph (100 km/h)	993 hPa (29.32 inHg)	Honduras, Nicaragua	Unknown	None	

=== Other systems ===
==== Michael Chenoweth ====
Identifying tropical cyclones in the 19th and early 20th century has historically been difficult due to the incompleteness of many ship reports, as well as confusion between tropical and extratropical systems. Fewer tropical cyclones are listed in HURDAT in 19th-century seasons than in 20th-century seasons. In 1997, José Fernández-Partágas and Henry Díaz proposed the addition of several hundred new tropical cyclones from the 19th century to HURDAT; these storms were added to HURDAT in 2001–03, resulting in the extension of the database back to 1851. Since then, the Atlantic hurricane reanalysis project has found many additional early storms and edited the tracks of others. Despite this, a 2004 study by Christopher Landsea concluded that up to six storms per season had been missed between 1851 and 1885 and up to four between 1886 and 1910. A 2008 study estimated that up to eight storms per year may have been missed prior to 1878. Another study concluded that 28% of storms affecting the Lesser Antilles, a common area for tropical cyclogenesis, were not included in HURDAT.

In 2014, a climate researcher, Michael Chenoweth, compiled a new database of Atlantic tropical cyclones from 1851 to 1898. His research found many unused logbooks, ship reports, and daily weather maps. These sources provided information on nearly a thousand candidate systems during this time period, of which 43% were identified as extratropical systems, tropical waves, tropical lows, and tropical depressions. Chenoweth also worked to extend storms' tracks to include the period when they were at tropical depression strength and removed or extended the tracks of "single-point" storms based on one isolated ship report. Chenoweth's research found that, out of 361 storms from 1851 to 1898 in HURDAT (approximately 7.7 storms per year), 62 were not tropical cyclones and 22 were described by HURDAT as separate systems despite being the same storm (thus, only 11 distinct storms). This brought the total down to 288 tropical cyclones, or 6.0 per year. Finally, Chenoweth added 209 new storms that his sources identified as being tropical cyclones, increasing the total to 497, or 10.4 per year. Many other storms had their tracks and intensities changed. As of 2025, Chenoweth's proposed changes have not been added to HURDAT.

The following is a list of tropical storms between 1851 and 1898 identified in Chenoweth's 2014 study as tropical cyclones, but do not appear in the Atlantic hurricane database.

Name	Duration	Peak intensity		Areas affected	Damage (USD)	Deaths	Refs
Name	Duration	Wind speed	Pressure	Areas affected	Damage (USD)	Deaths	Refs
Unnamed	August 1 – 7, 1851	40 mph (65 km/h)	Not Specified	Lesser Antilles	Unknown	Unknown	
Unnamed	August 28 – September 4, 1851	45 mph (75 km/h)	Not Specified	United States East Coast	Unknown	Unknown	
Unnamed	September 6 – 8, 1851	45 mph (75 km/h)	Not Specified	The Bahamas, Cuba, Florida, United States East Coast	Unknown	Unknown	
Unnamed	September 10 – 12, 1851	45 mph (75 km/h)	Not Specified	None	None	None	
Unnamed	September 12 – 16, 1851	50 mph (85 km/h)	Not Specified	Texas	Unknown	Unknown	
Unnamed	September 16 – 27, 1851	45 mph (75 km/h)	Not Specified	None	None	None	
Unnamed	October 9 – 14, 1851	65 mph (100 km/h)	Not Specified	Northeastern United States, Atlantic Canada	Unknown	Unknown	
Unnamed	November 4 – 19, 1851	65 mph (100 km/h)	Not Specified	The Bahamas, Jamaica, Cuba	Unknown	Unknown	
Unnamed	August 28 – 31, 1852	60 mph (95 km/h)	Not Specified	United States East Coast	Unknown	Unknown	
Unnamed	September 2 – 6, 1852	50 mph (85 km/h)	Not Specified	None	None	None	
Unnamed	September 21 – 24, 1852	65 mph (100 km/h)	Not Specified	Yucatán Peninsula	Unknown	Unknown	
Unnamed	September 28 – October 3, 1852	50 mph (85 km/h)	Not Specified	Venezuela, Nicaragua	Unknown	Unknown	
Unnamed	November 26 – 27, 1852	50 mph (85 km/h)	Not Specified	Florida	Unknown	Unknown	
Unnamed	August 3 – 5, 1853	50 mph (85 km/h)	Not Specified	Florida	Unknown	Unknown	
Unnamed	August 25 – 27, 1853	60 mph (95 km/h)	Not Specified	Jamaica	Unknown	Unknown	
Unnamed	August 26 – September 3, 1853	65 mph (100 km/h)	Not Specified	The Caribbean, Florida	Unknown	Unknown	
Unnamed	September 7–11, 1853	50 mph (85 km/h)	Not Specified	Southeastern United States	Unknown	Unknown	
Unnamed	September 20 – 22, 1853	50 mph (85 km/h)	Not Specified	Mexico	Unknown	Unknown	
Unnamed	September 26 – 28, 1853	65 mph (100 km/h)	992 hPa (29.29 inHg)	None	None	None	
Unnamed	September 9 – 15, 1854	50 mph (85 km/h)	Not Specified	None	None	None	
Unnamed	October 5 – 15, 1854	65 mph (100 km/h)	Not Specified	Lesser Antilles	Unknown	Unknown	
Unnamed	November 4 – 5, 1854	50 mph (85 km/h)	Not Specified	None	None	None	
Unnamed	July 24 – 25, 1855	40 mph (65 km/h)	Not Specified	Mexico	Unknown	Unknown	
Unnamed	August 3 – 7, 1855	50 mph (85 km/h)	Not Specified	Louisiana	Unknown	Unknown	
Unnamed	August 31 – September 2, 1855	50 mph (85 km/h)	1002 hPa (29.59 inHg)	None	None	None	
Unnamed	September 19 – 27, 1855	65 mph (100 km/h)	990 hPa (29.23 inHg)	None	None	None	
Unnamed	November 3 – 8, 1855	65 mph (100 km/h)	995 hPa (29.38 inHg)	None	None	None	
Unnamed	September 27 – October 1, 1856	45 mph (75 km/h)	Not Specified	None	None	None	
Unnamed	October 13 – 16, 1856	45 mph (75 km/h)	Not Specified	Azores	Unknown	Unknown	
Unnamed	June 22 – 25, 1857	50 mph (85 km/h)	Not Specified	Louisiana	Unknown	Unknown	
Unnamed	July 3 – 4, 1857	40 mph (65 km/h)	Not Specified	Florida	Unknown	Unknown	
Unnamed	September 7 – 16, 1857	65 mph (100 km/h)	Not Specified	Central America	Unknown	Unknown	
Unnamed	October 16 – 22, 1857	65 mph (100 km/h)	Not Specified	None	None	None	
Unnamed	June 10 – 15, 1858	65 mph (100 km/h)	Not Specified	Mexico	Unknown	Unknown	
Unnamed	August 11 – 20, 1858	50 mph (85 km/h)	Not Specified	Virginia	Unknown	Unknown	
Unnamed	October 16 – 20, 1858	50 mph (85 km/h)	Not Specified	None	None	None	
Unnamed	November 14 – 18, 1858	50 mph (85 km/h)	Not Specified	None	None	None	
Unnamed	August 23 – 25, 1859	50 mph (85 km/h)	Not Specified	None	None	None	
Unnamed	September 28 – October 7, 1859	50 mph (85 km/h)	Not Specified	None	None	None	
Unnamed	October 10 – 18, 1859	65 mph (100 km/h)	Not Specified	The Bahamas	Unknown	None	
Unnamed	November 8 – 15, 1859	65 mph (100 km/h)	Not Specified	Central America, Cuba, Florida	Unknown	None	
Unnamed	August 13 – 18, 1860	50 mph (85 km/h)	Not Specified	None	None	None	
Unnamed	September 14 – 15, 1860	50 mph (85 km/h)	Not Specified	None	None	None	
Unnamed (Note: Chenoweth identified this storm as subtropical.)	July 20 – 25, 1861	60 mph (95 km/h)	Not Specified	North Carolina	Unknown	None	
Unnamed	July 28 – August 1, 1861	50 mph (85 km/h)	Not Specified	Central America, Mexico	Unknown	None	
Unnamed	October 1 – 10, 1861	60 mph (95 km/h)	Not Specified	Lesser Antilles	Unknown	None	
Unnamed	October 16 – 22, 1861	50 mph (85 km/h)	Not Specified	Outer Banks	Unknown	None	
Unnamed	October 31 – November 3, 1861	70 mph (110 km/h)	992 hPa (29.29 inHg)	Southeastern United States	Unknown	None	
Unnamed	May 26 – 30, 1862	50 mph (85 km/h)	Not Specified	None	None	None	
Unnamed	July 7 – 8, 1862	40 mph (65 km/h)	Not Specified	Florida	Unknown	None	
Unnamed	July 16 – 18, 1862	45 mph (75 km/h)	Not Specified	Texas	Unknown	None	
Unnamed	August 24 – 25, 1862	50 mph (85 km/h)	Not Specified	Mexico	Unknown	None	
Unnamed	September 12 – 18, 1862	70 mph (110 km/h)	Not Specified	The Bahamas, Southeastern United States	Unknown	None	
Unnamed	October 5 – 9, 1863	40 mph (65 km/h)	Not Specified	None	None	None	
Unnamed	July 23 – 25, 1864	40 mph (65 km/h)	Not Specified	United States East Coast	Unknown	None	
Unnamed	August 26 – 31, 1864	50 mph (85 km/h)	Not Specified	None	None	None	
Unnamed	August 29 – September 2, 1864	50 mph (85 km/h)	Not Specified	Canary Islands	Unknown	None	
Unnamed	September 2 – 13, 1864	50 mph (85 km/h)	Not Specified	Lesser Antilles, Hispaniola, The Bahamas	Unknown	None	
Unnamed	October 8 – 10, 1864	50 mph (85 km/h)	980 hPa (28.94 inHg)	Hispaniola, The Bahamas, Azores	Unknown	None	
Unnamed	August 26 – 30, 1865	40 mph (65 km/h)	Not Specified	Florida, The Bahamas	Unknown	None	
Unnamed	September 30 – October 4, 1865	65 mph (100 km/h)	1001 hPa (29.56 inHg)	Cuba, Florida, The Bahamas, Newfoundland	Unknown	None	
Unnamed	October 8 – 13, 1865	55 mph (90 km/h)	Not Specified	Hispaniola	Unknown	None	
Unnamed	June 1 – 6, 1866	65 mph (100 km/h)	Not Specified	Louisiana	Unknown	None	
Unnamed	September 26 – 30, 1866	65 mph (100 km/h)	Not Specified	The Bahamas, North Carolina	Unknown	None	
Unnamed	July 19 – 20, 1867	40 mph (65 km/h)	Not Specified	Mexico	Unknown	None	
Unnamed	August 10 – 16, 1867	50 mph (85 km/h)	Not Specified	Florida, United States East Coast	Unknown	None	
Unnamed	August 30 – September 1, 1867	60 mph (95 km/h)	Not Specified	North Carolina	Unknown	None	
Unnamed	September 15 – 17, 1867	40 mph (65 km/h)	Not Specified	Louisiana, Mississippi	Unknown	None	
Unnamed	September 24 - October 3, 1867	60 mph (95 km/h)	Not Specified	None	None	None	
Unnamed	June 8 – 11, 1868	50 mph (85 km/h)	Not Specified	North Carolina	Unknown	None	
Unnamed	July 10 – 13, 1868	40 mph (65 km/h)	Not Specified	Lesser Antilles, Hispaniola	Unknown	None	
Unnamed	August 9 – 15, 1869	60 mph (95 km/h)	Not Specified	None	None	None	
Unnamed	October 2 – 4, 1869	40 mph (65 km/h)	Not Specified	Lesser Antilles	Unknown	None	
Unnamed	August 1 – 3, 1870	45 mph (75 km/h)	Not Specified	None	None	None	
Unnamed	September 20 – October 1, 1870	45 mph (75 km/h)	Not Specified	Azores	Unknown	None	
Unnamed	October 24 – 25, 1870	50 mph (85 km/h)	Not Specified	None	None	None	
Unnamed	August 16 – 18, 1871	50 mph (85 km/h)	Not Specified	None	None	None	
Unnamed	September 16 – 18, 1871	50 mph (85 km/h)	Not Specified	Belize	Unknown	None	
Unnamed	October 2 – 5, 1871	60 mph (95 km/h)	Not Specified	Nicaragua	Unknown	None	
Unnamed	August 18 – 24, 1873	65 mph (100 km/h)	Not Specified	None	None	None	
Unnamed	September 14 – 16, 1874	50 mph (85 km/h)	Not Specified	None	None	None	
Unnamed	September 15 – 21, 1875	60 mph (95 km/h)	Not Specified	None	None	None	
Unnamed	August 17 – 25, 1876	65 mph (100 km/h)	Not Specified	Lesser Antilles, Hispaniola, Cuba, Bahamas	Unknown	None	
Unnamed	September 2 – 11, 1876	65 mph (100 km/h)	Not Specified	None	None	None	
Unnamed	September 12 – 18, 1876	60 mph (95 km/h)	Not Specified	None	None	None	
Unnamed	August 1 – 3, 1877	70 mph (110 km/h)	Not Specified	None	None	None	
Unnamed	August 24 – 30, 1877	50 mph (85 km/h)	Not Specified	None	None	None	
Unnamed	October 2 – 6, 1877	65 mph (100 km/h)	Not Specified	Azores	Unknown	None	
Unnamed	July 7 – 12, 1878	65 mph (100 km/h)	Not Specified	Lesser Antilles, The Bahamas, Florida	Unknown	None	
Unnamed	September 13 – 17, 1878	40 mph (65 km/h)	Not Specified	Mexico	Unknown	None	
Unnamed	October 23 – 28, 1878	50 mph (85 km/h)	994 hPa (29.35 inHg)	None	None	None	
Unnamed	November 25 – December 2, 1878	65 mph (100 km/h)	Not Specified	Lesser Antilles, Hispaniola	Unknown	None	

== Landfalls ==
This table includes all tropical storms from 1851 onward that are verified by HURDAT to have made landfall. Tropical storms that are not marked as having made landfall are omitted.

=== 1800s ===
Landfalls (1800s)
Name	Year	Tropical storm
Six	1851	Rhode Island (October 19)
Three	1856	North Carolina (August 19)
Seven	1859	Florida (October 17)
Seven	1861	North Carolina (October 7)
Six	1863	North Carolina (September 18)
Nine	1863	Texas (September 29)
Two	1865	Texas (June 30)
Seven	1865	Louisiana (September 7)
Two	1868	Florida (October 4)
One	1871	Texas (June 4)
Two	1871	Texas (June 9)
One	1872	Louisiana (July 11), Mississippi (July 11)
One	1873	Florida (June 2)
Four	1873	Florida (September 23)
One	1874	Texas (July 4)
Four	1875	Florida (September 27)
Seven	1877	Florida (October 26)
One	1878	Florida (July 2)
Five	1879	Louisiana (October 7)
Six	1879	Florida (October 16)
One	1880	Texas (June 24)
One	1881	Mississippi (August 3)
Two	1881	Texas (August 13)
Three	1882	Louisiana (September 15)
Four	1882	North Carolina (September 22), New Jersey (September 24)
Three	1885	Florida (August 30)
Eight	1885	Florida (October 11)
Three	1887	Mississippi (June 14)
Sixteen	1887	Florida (October 30)
Two	1888	Texas (July 5)
Five	1888	Florida (September 8)
Nine	1889	Florida (October 5), Florida (October 6)
Two	1890	Louisiana (August 27)
Seven	1891	Florida (October 7)
One	1892	Florida (June 10)
Four	1892	Louisiana (September 12)
Nine	1892	Florida (October 24)
Eleven	1893	North Carolina (October 23), Delaware (October 23)
Two	1894	Alabama (August 7)
One	1895	Louisiana (August 15), Alabama (August 16)
Four	1895	Texas (October 7)
Six	1895	Florida (October 16)
Three	1897	Florida (September 21), North Carolina (September 23), New York (September 24), Connecticut (September 24)
Six	1897	North Carolina (October 25)
Five	1898	Louisiana (September 20)
Six	1898	Texas (September 28)
One	1899	Texas (June 27)
Six	1899	Florida (October 5)

=== 1900s ===
Landfalls (1900s)
Name	Year	Tropical storm
Four	1900	Louisiana (September 13), Mississippi (September 13)
Six	1900	Florida (October 12)
One	1901	Florida (June 13)
Two	1901	Texas (July 10)
Ten	1901	Florida (September 28)
One	1902	Florida (June 14)
Six	1904	Florida (November 3)
Three	1905	Louisiana (September 29)
Five	1905	Louisiana (October 9)
One	1906	Florida (June 12)
One	1907	Florida (June 28)
Two	1907	Mississippi (September 21)
Three	1907	Florida (September 28)
Four	1908	Louisiana (July 31)
Five	1908	North Carolina (September 1)
Three	1909	Florida (June 28), Florida (June 30)
Eight	1909	Florida (August 29)
One	1912	Louisiana (June 13)
Two	1912	Georgia (July 15)
One	1914	Florida (September 17)

== See also ==
- List of Eastern Pacific tropical storms
- List of Western Pacific tropical storms
