= 1868 Atlantic hurricane season =

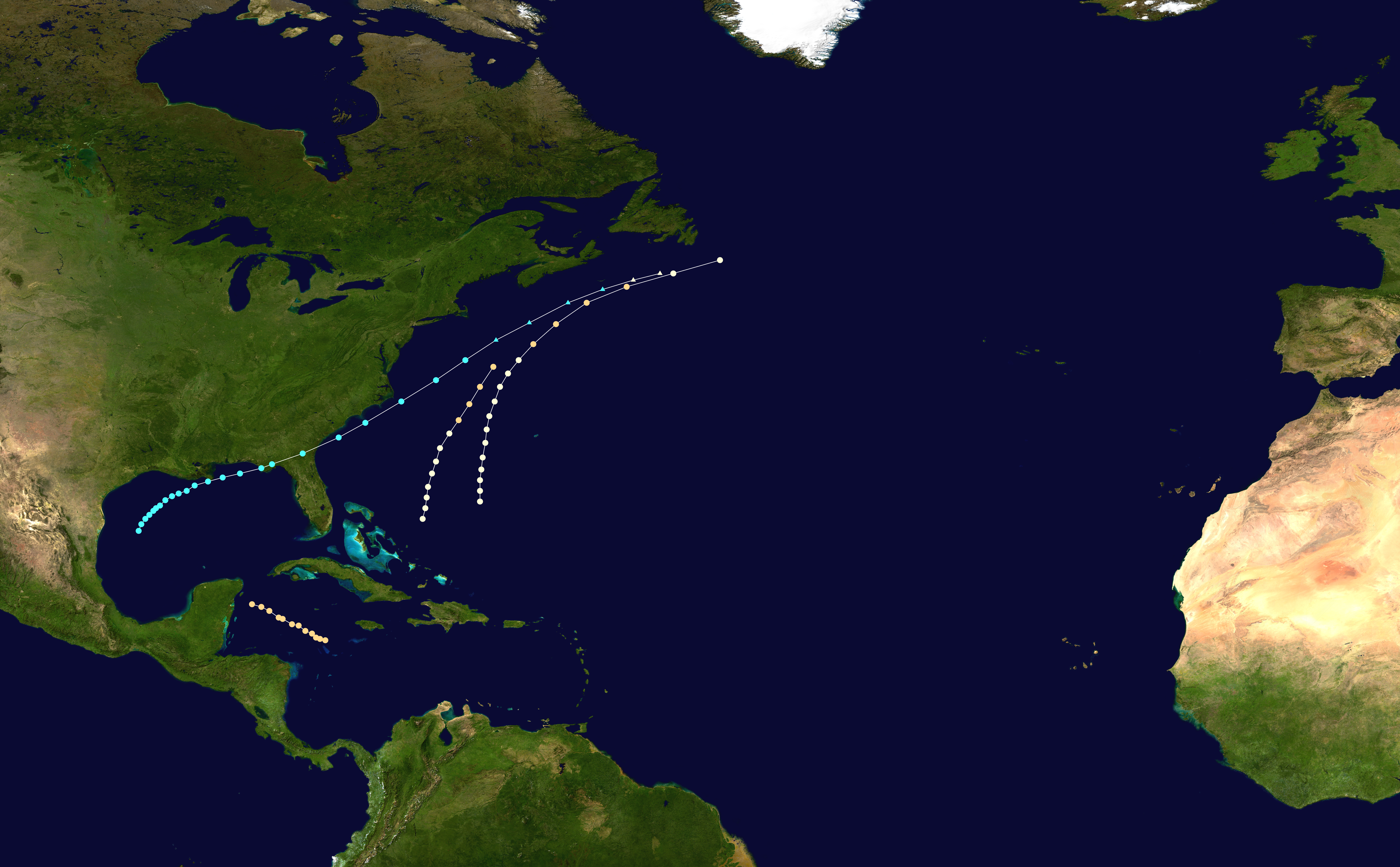
- Season summary map

Seasonal boundaries
- First system formed: September 3, 1868
- Last system dissipated: October 17, 1868

Strongest storm
- Name: One, Three, and Four
  - Maximum winds: 105 mph (165 km/h) (1-minute sustained)

Seasonal statistics
- Total depressions: 4
- Total storms: 4
- Hurricanes: 3
- Total fatalities: 2
- Total damage: $5,000 (1868 USD)

The 1868 Atlantic hurricane season was among the quietest on record, with only four tropical cyclones recorded. Initially, there were no known storms during the season, although a re-analysis confirmed the activity. All tropical activity occurred within a 45‑day span. There may have been other unconfirmed tropical cyclones during the season. Meteorologist Christopher Landsea estimates up to six storms were missed from the official database, due to small tropical cyclone size, sparse ship reports, and relatively unpopulated coastlines.

Only one of the storms, the second, made landfall, doing so near Apalachicola, Florida. It produced heavy rainfall and gusty winds across the Southeastern United States, although there was no severe damage associated with the storm. The first hurricane killed two people when a ship passed through its winds for 14 hours. The third hurricane, located in the western Caribbean Sea, did not affect land, although two ships experienced its strong winds. The final hurricane lasted three days across the western Atlantic, forcing one ship to halt its voyage due to storm damage.

== Systems ==
=== Hurricane One ===
- Category 2 hurricane (SSHWS)
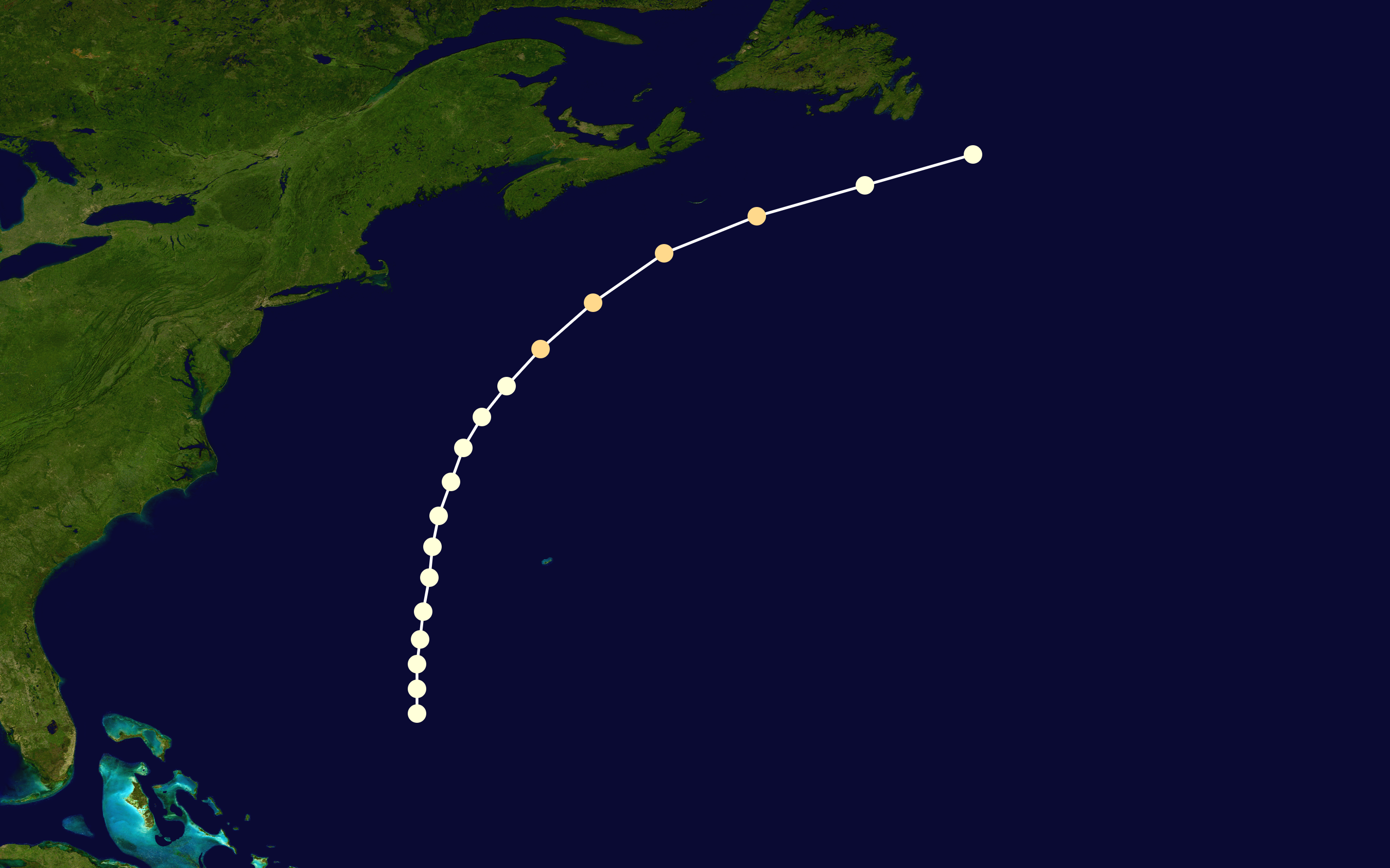
- Duration: September 3 – September 7
- Peak intensity: 105 mph (165 km/h) (1-min);

The first known tropical cyclone of the season was observed on September 3, about halfway between the Bahamas and Bermuda. A nearby ship estimated winds of 80 mph (130 km), indicating the presence of the hurricane. It moved northward initially, passing about 220 mi (350 km) west of Bermuda on September 4. Thereafter, the hurricane turned toward the northeast, and the ship "John Richardson" encountered gale force winds on September 5, resulting in a wreck of its cargo. On September 6, it was estimated to have reached peak winds of 105 mph (169 km/h), based on observations from the ship with the call sign "Greenock". The hurricane lashed the ship with strong winds for 14 hours, killing the captain and one crewman. At the time, it was about 400 mi (640 km) southeast of Halifax, Nova Scotia. Turning to the northeast, the hurricane passed south of Newfoundland before last being observed on September 7.

=== Tropical Storm Two ===
- Tropical storm (SSHWS)
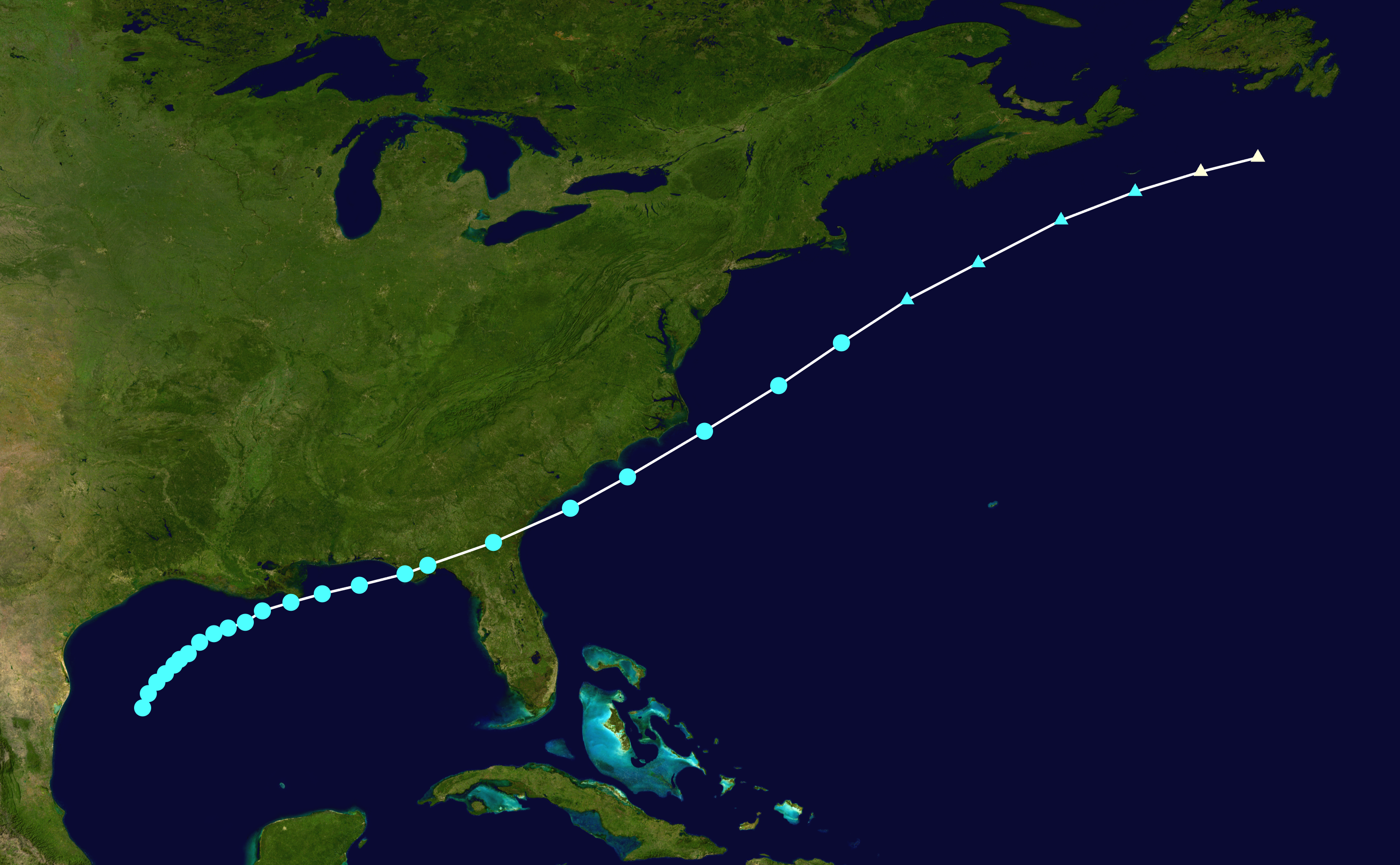
- Duration: October 1 – October 6
- Peak intensity: 70 mph (110 km/h) (1-min);

A ship sunk in the western Gulf of Mexico on October 1, which was the first indication of the second tropical cyclone of the season. The storm moved slowly northeastward toward the southeastern Louisiana coastline, intensifying to its estimated peak winds of 70 mph (110 km/h). On October 4, it passed near or over southeastern Louisiana, producing heavy rain and gusty winds in New Orleans. Flooding was observed in portions of the city, and the West Rigolets Lighthouse on Lake Pontchartrain suffered $5,000 in damage due to the storm (1868 USD, $81,000 2010 USD). The storm accelerated northeastward and struck near Apalachicola, Florida late on October 4.

As the storm crossed over the Florida panhandle and southeastern Georgia, the winds weakened to 45 mph (72 km/h), although it still produced heavy rainfall and gusty winds in Savannah, Georgia. No severe damage was reported in the city. The tropical storm continued northeastward, emerging into the western Atlantic and paralleling the coastlines of the Carolinas just offshore. Several ships reported strong winds and rough seas. On October 6, the storm restrengthened to its peak intensity before becoming an extratropical cyclone about 200 mi (320 km) southeast of Cape Cod; however, one meteorologist assessed it as acquiring extratropical characteristics after it exited Georgia into the western Atlantic. As an extratropical storm, it reached winds of 80 mph (130 km/h), based on a ship report south of Atlantic Canada. Late on October 7, the storm was last observed to the south of Newfoundland. The storm was the only one in the season not to attain hurricane status.

=== Hurricane Three ===
- Category 2 hurricane (SSHWS)
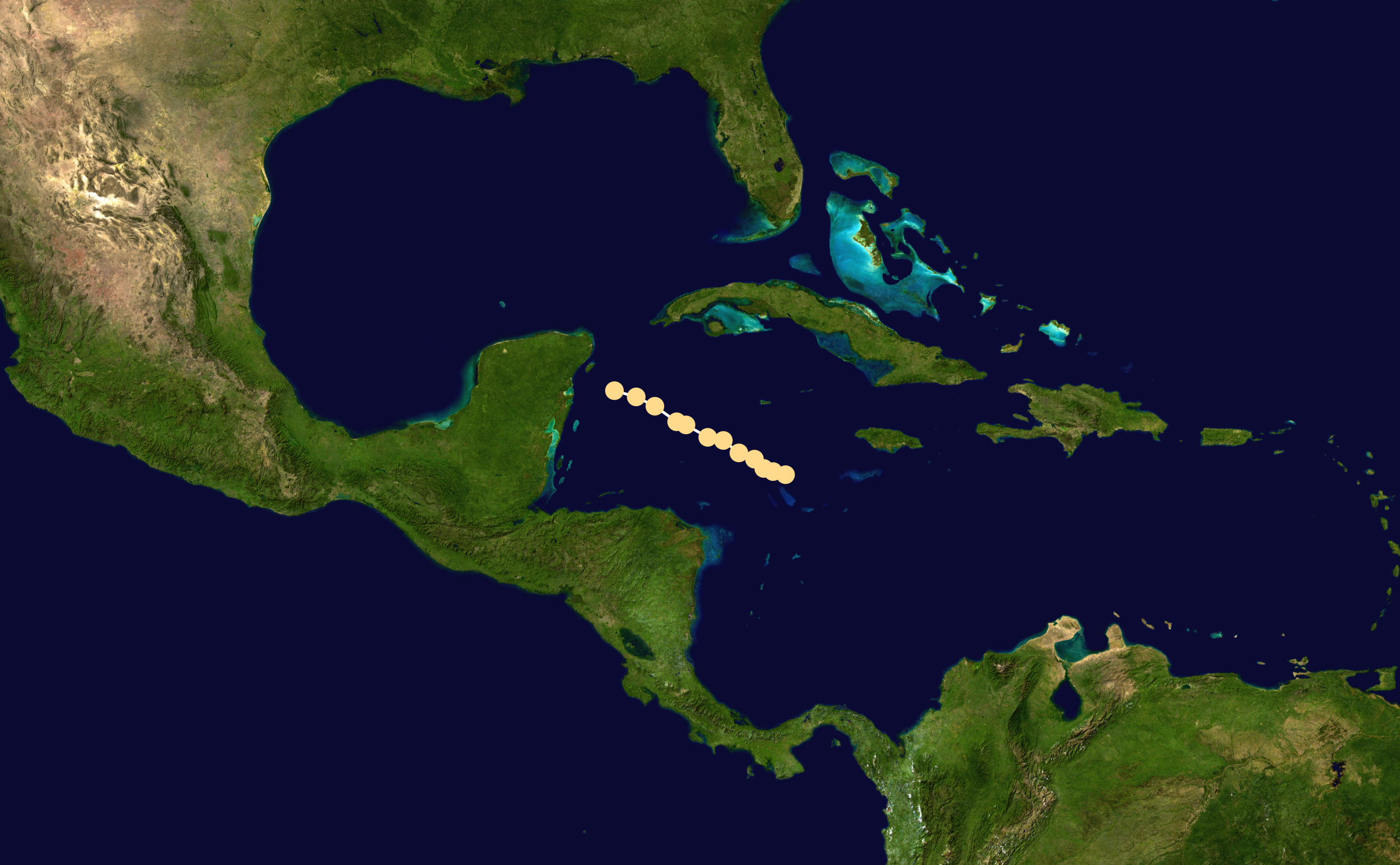
- Duration: October 5 – October 7
- Peak intensity: 105 mph (165 km/h) (1-min);

As the previous storm was moving along the coastline of the southeastern United States, a new hurricane was observed in the western Caribbean Sea, about halfway between Honduras and Jamaica. Its intensity, based on a ship report, was estimated at 105 mph (169 km/h). The hurricane moved slowly west-northwestward, and another ship experienced its strong winds on October 7. There were no further observations, so its complete track is unknown.

=== Hurricane Four ===
- Category 2 hurricane (SSHWS)
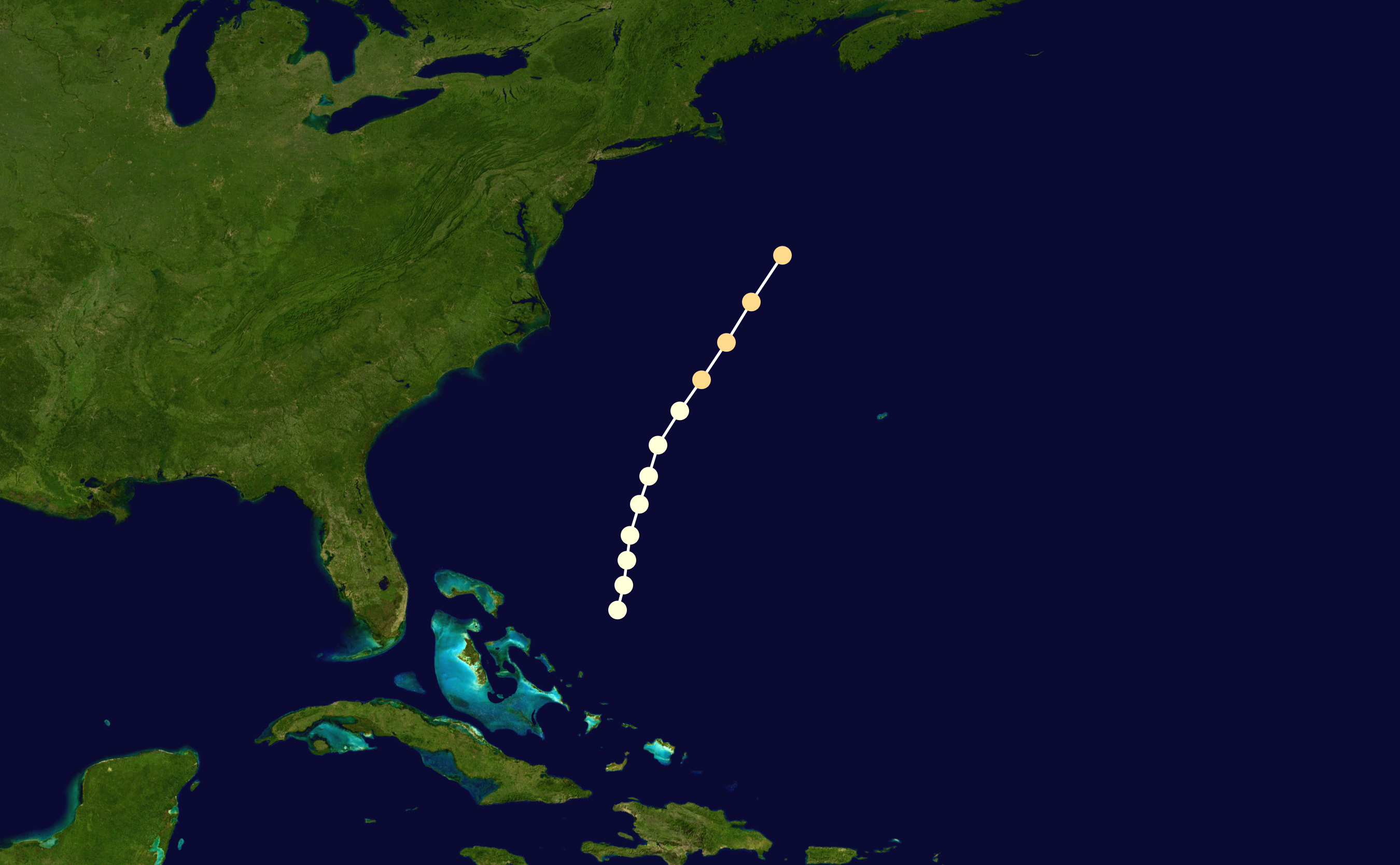
- Duration: October 15 – October 17
- Peak intensity: 105 mph (165 km/h) (1-min);

The final known hurricane of the season was observed on October 15, to the northeast of the central Bahamas. The ship "Jim Cow", en route from New York to Panama, suffered heavy damage from the storm, so much that it could not complete its voyage. Moving generally northeastward, the hurricane was estimated to have reached peak winds of 105 mph (169 km/h), based on ship reports. On October 17 the cyclone was absorbed by a rapidly intensifying extratropical cyclone off the coast of New England. It never affected land.

== See also ==
- Atlantic hurricane
- Atlantic hurricane reanalysis project
- Tropical cyclone observation
