= 1864 Atlantic hurricane season =

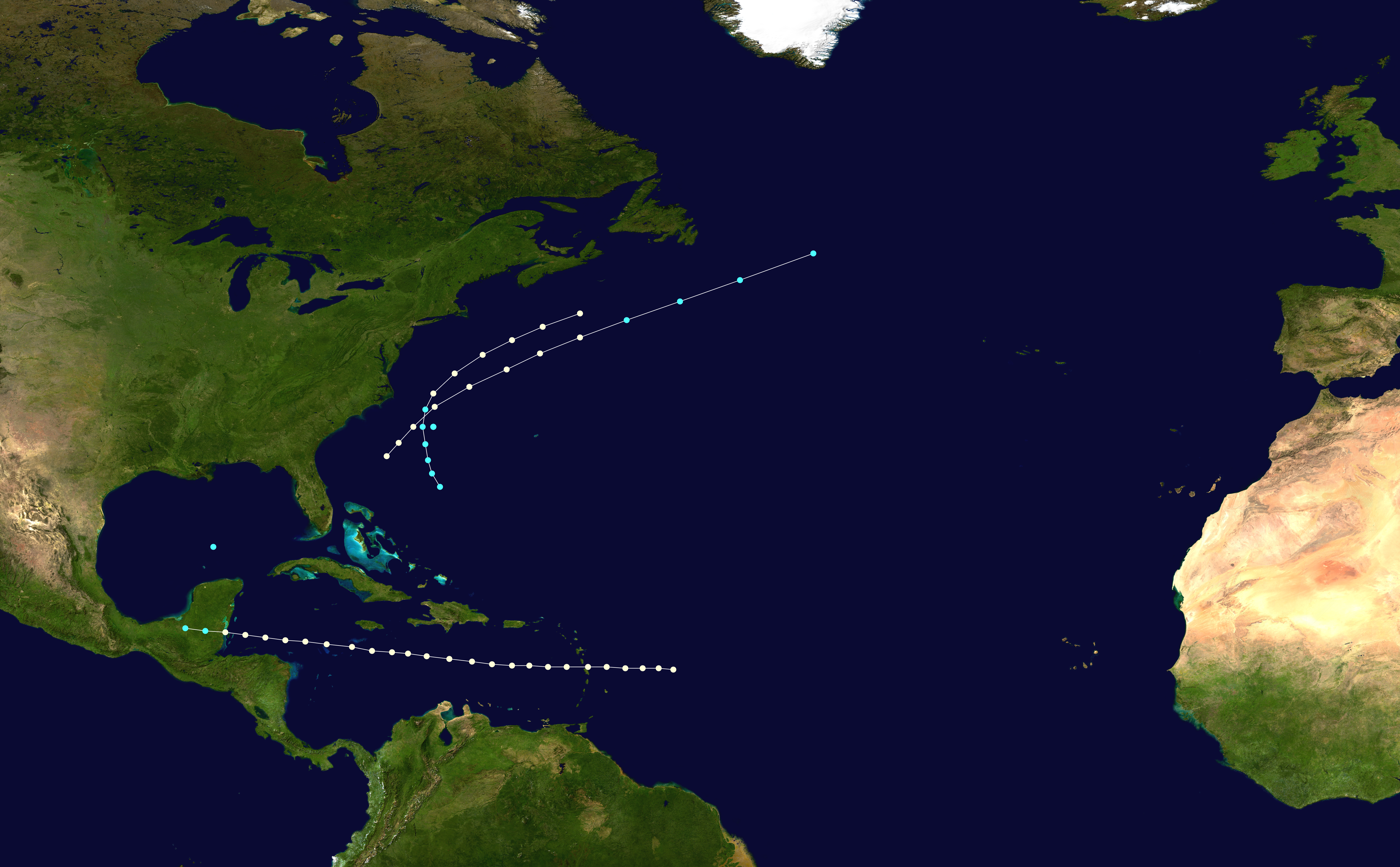
- Season summary map

Seasonal boundaries
- First system formed: July 16, 1864
- Last system dissipated: October 24, 1864

Strongest storm
- Name: One, Three, and Five
  - Maximum winds: 80 mph (130 km/h) (1-minute sustained)

Seasonal statistics
- Total storms: 5
- Total fatalities: 0
- Total damage: Unknown

The 1864 Atlantic hurricane season was the third consecutive Atlantic hurricane season with no hurricane landfall in the United States – the longest period on record. Of the five known 1864 cyclones, four were first documented in 1995 by Jose Fernandez-Partagas and Henry Diaz. In the absence of modern satellite and other remote-sensing technologies, only storms that affected populated land areas or encountered ships at sea were recorded, so the actual total could be higher. An undercount bias of zero to six tropical cyclones per year between 1851 and 1885 has been estimated. The first system was initially observed offshore the Southeastern United States on July 16. It peaked as a Category 1 hurricane on the modern day Saffir–Simpson hurricane wind scale. Moving rapidly northeastward, the storm was last noted well east of Newfoundland on July 18.

The next system was observed in the south-central Gulf of Mexico on July 25. Because the cyclone was not tracked further, only a single-point storm path exists. After tropical cyclogenesis was dormant for over a month, another hurricane was spotted on August 26 to the east of the Lesser Antilles. Early on the following day, the hurricane crossed the islands between Dominica and Martinique. After traversing the Caribbean Sea, the storm made landfall in Belize late on August 31, before dissipating the next day. Offshore Belize, several ships encountered the storm. Along the coast, storm surge flooded some areas. The fourth tropical storm was observed off the East Coast of the United States between September 5 and September 9. A number of ships sailing in the vicinity of the storm encountered heavy gales. The fifth and final known tropical cyclone was also tracked offshore the East Coast of the United States. Similarly, many vessels experienced rough seas and severe thunderstorms.

== Systems ==
=== Hurricane One ===
- Category 1 hurricane (SSHWS)
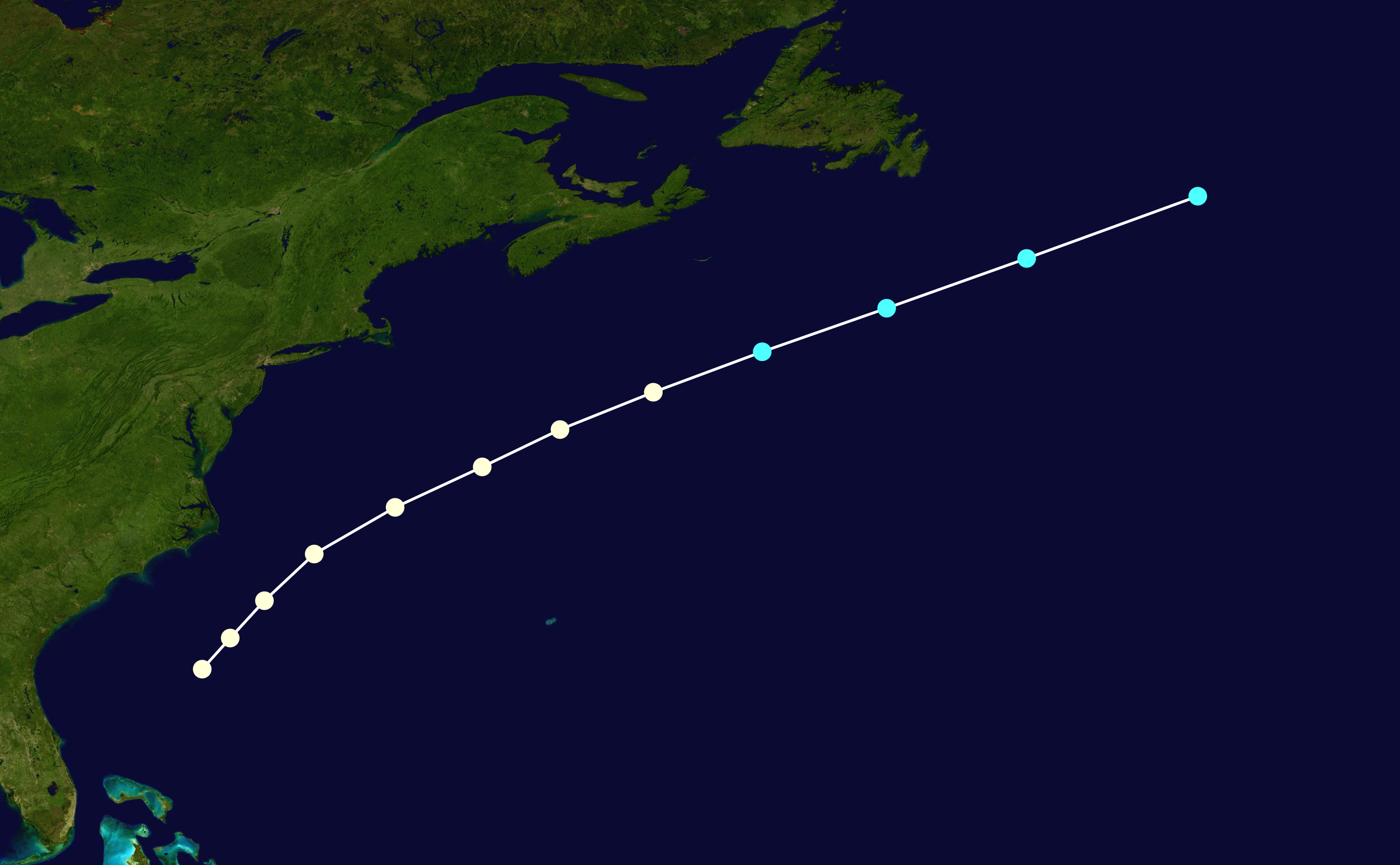
- Duration: July 16 – July 18
- Peak intensity: 80 mph (130 km/h) (1-min);

This storm was first observed by the brig Hattie Eaton on July 16, while located a few hundred miles offshore the Carolinas. The Hattie Eaton reported sustained winds of 80 mph (130 km/h) – equivalent to a Category 1 hurricane on the modern day Saffir–Simpson hurricane wind scale. Early on July 18, the hurricane weakened to a tropical storm. Several hours later, the storm was last noted by ship Energy, while located about 435 mi (700 km) east of Cape Race, Newfoundland.

=== Tropical Storm Two ===
- Tropical storm (SSHWS)
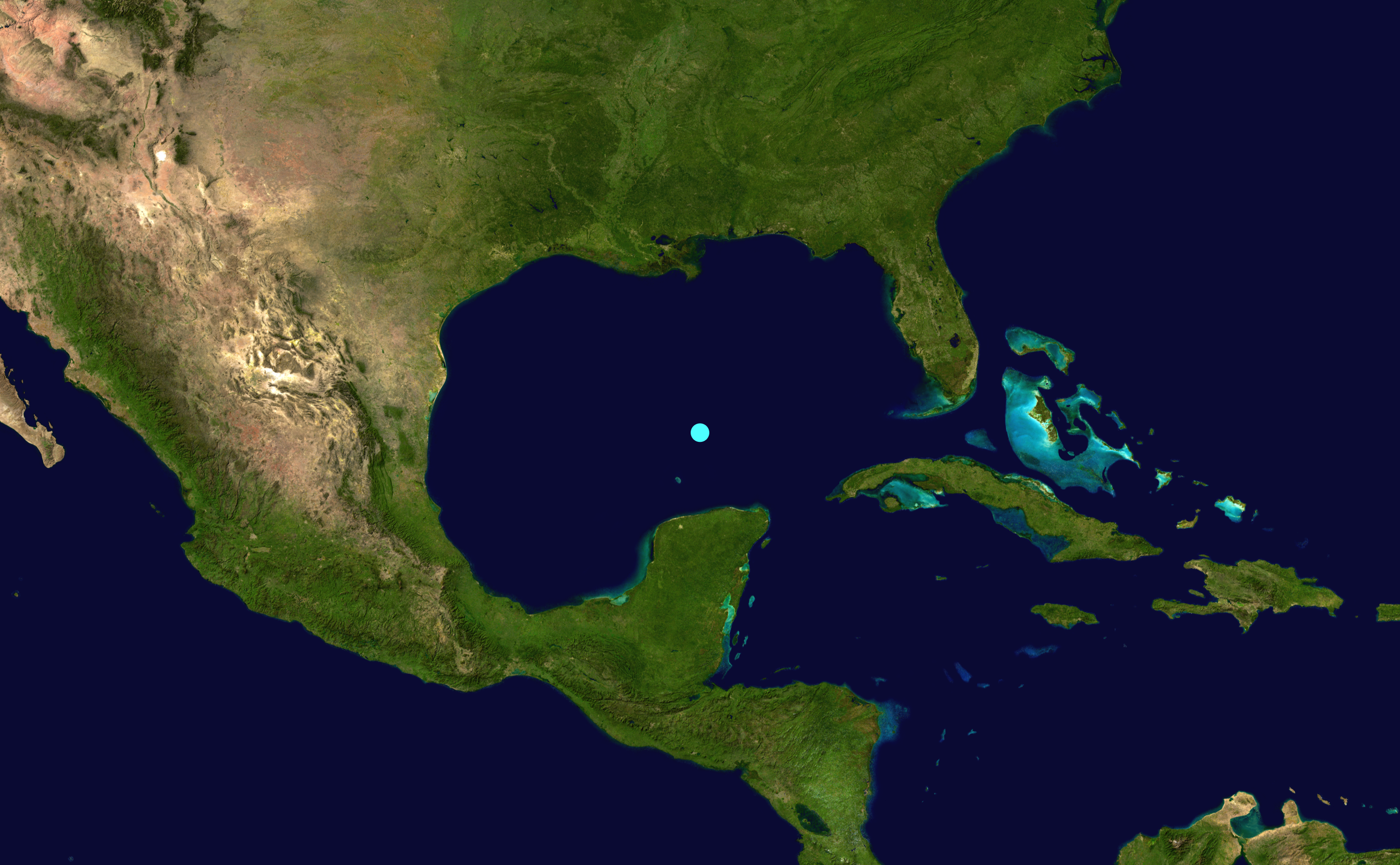
- Duration: July 25 – July 25
- Peak intensity: 70 mph (110 km/h) (1-min);

This storm is known from a single ship report. On July 25, the bark Daniel bound for New York from Matamoros, Tamaulipas encountered a tropical storm off the Alacran reef, north of the Yucatan Peninsula. The vessel spent several hours in the cyclone and was also struck by lightning. Climate researcher Michael Chenoweth proposed the removal of this storm from HURDAT, noting "Insufficient supporting evidence from other neighboring data sources" and considering the possibility that the severe weather was a localized event.

=== Hurricane Three ===
- Category 1 hurricane (SSHWS)
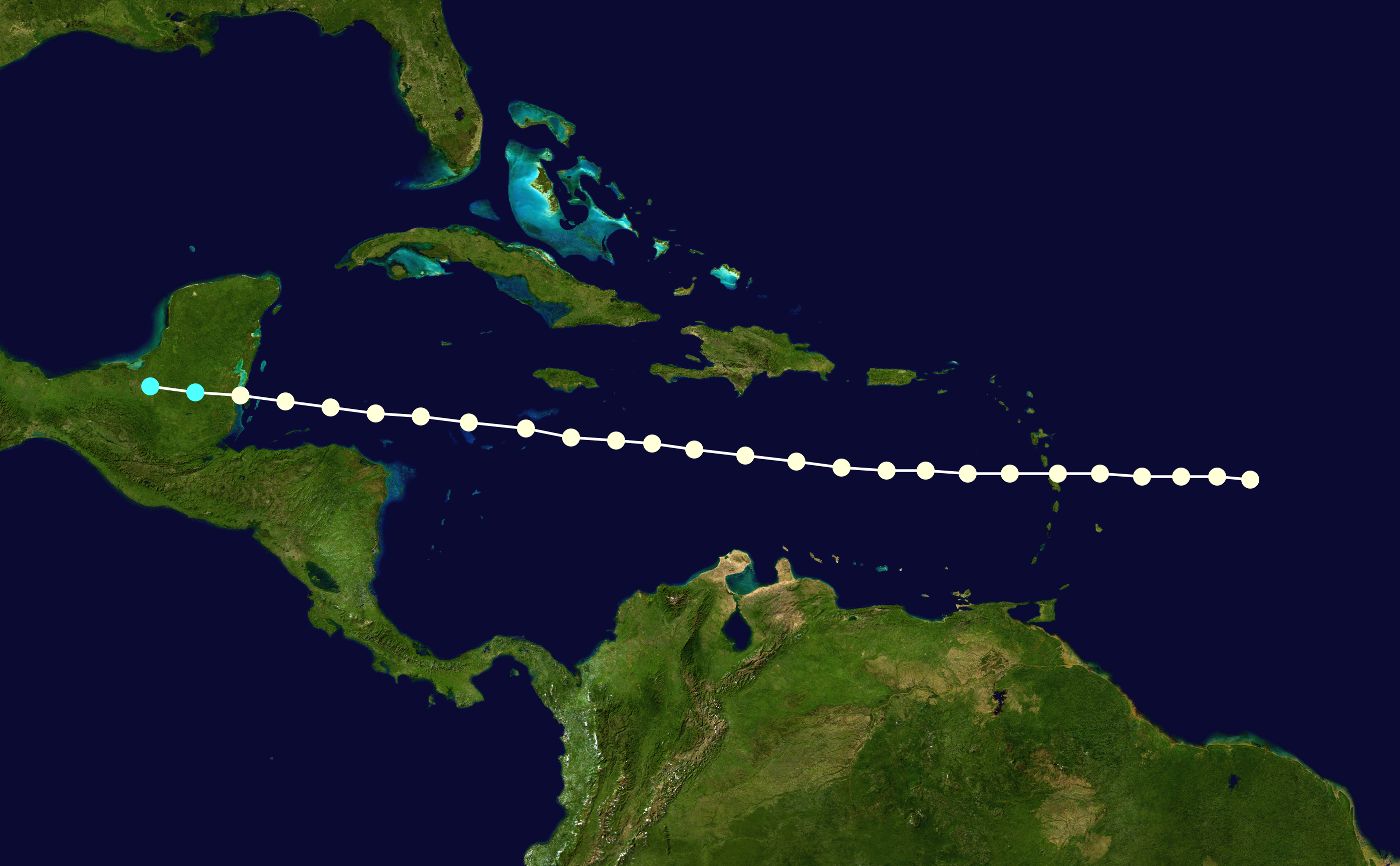
- Duration: August 26 – September 1
- Peak intensity: 80 mph (130 km/h) (1-min);

A hurricane was first observed well east of the Lesser Antilles on August 26. The storm moved westward and brought severe weather to Martinique, including hurricane-force winds. Throughout its trek across the Caribbean Sea, the system maintained winds of 80 mph (130 km/h). Late on August 31, the hurricane made landfall in Belize District of Belize. Off the coast, several ships were damaged or sunk. The brig Antonio, the Hannah, and the bark Berkshire were among the ships that capsized. On land, tides up to 5 ft (1.5 m) above normal caused coastal flooding in Belize. This storm has been paleotempestologically traced in sediment near Gales Point. The system steadily weakened over land.

=== Tropical Storm Four ===
- Tropical storm (SSHWS)
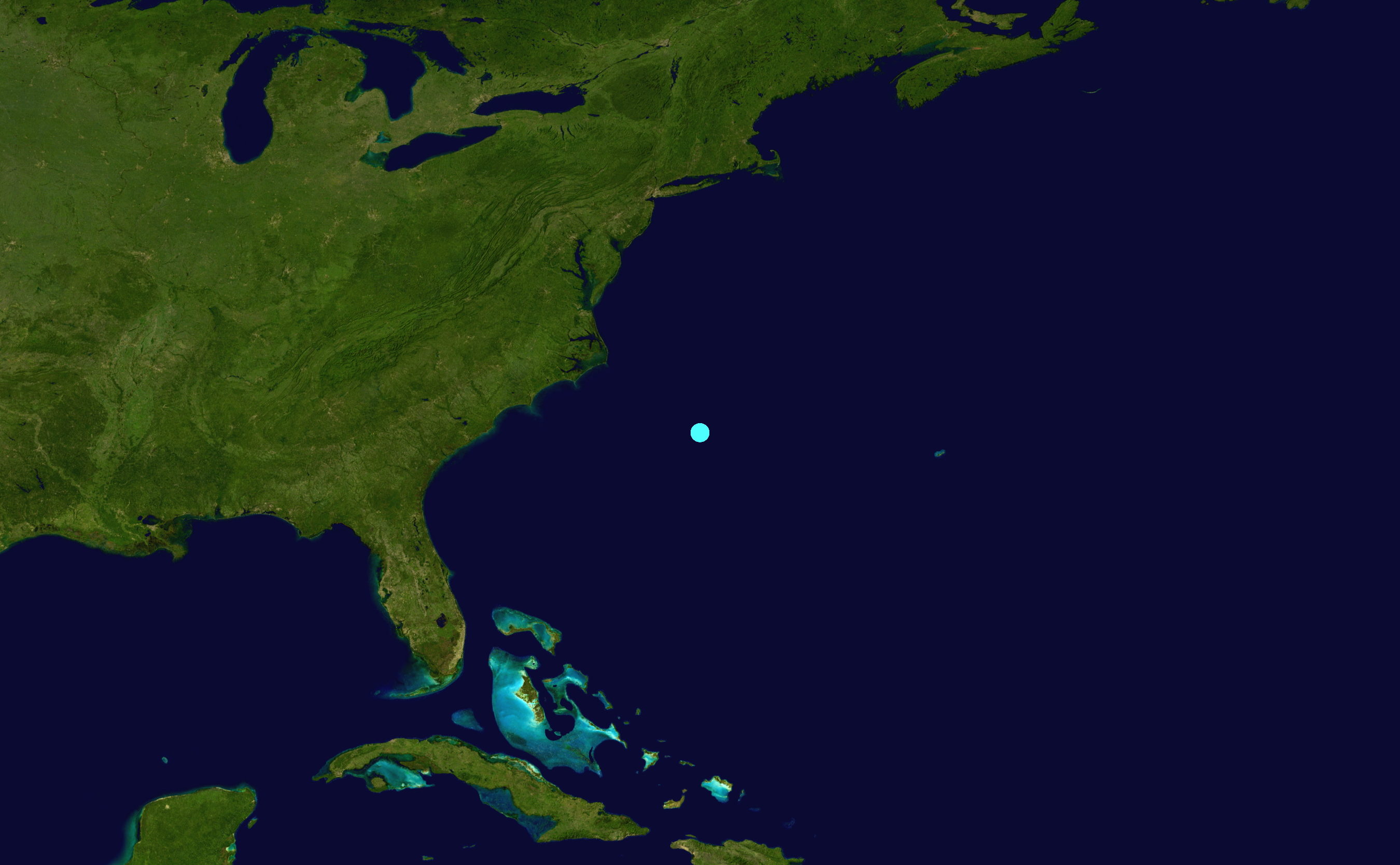
- Duration: September 5 – September 8
- Peak intensity: 60 mph (95 km/h) (1-min);

Based on reports from several ships, a tropical storm is known to have existed off the East Coast of the United States between September 5 and September 8. A number of ships approaching New York on September 5 reported an easterly gale. Vessels off Hatteras and Barnegat endured the storm through September 8. Chenoweth proposed the exclusion of this storm from HURDAT, attributing the gale conditions to a cold front and then a high-pressure area moving offshore the East Coast of the United States.

=== Hurricane Five ===
- Category 1 hurricane (SSHWS)
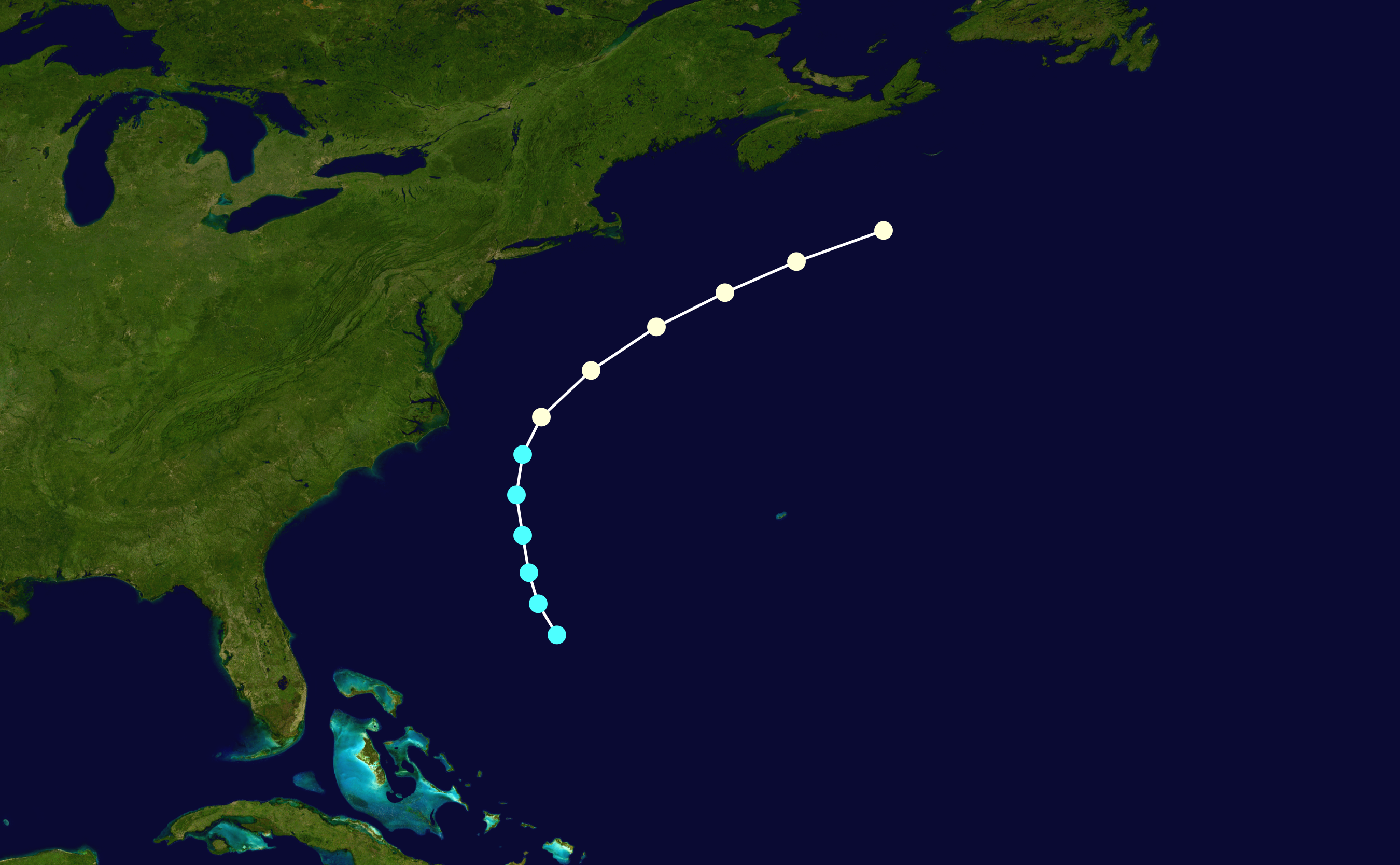
- Duration: October 22 – October 24
- Peak intensity: 80 mph (130 km/h) (1-min);

The final tropical cyclone of the season was observed by the Santa Martha early on October 22, while located about 355 mi (570 km) east-northeast of the Abaco Islands. Based on reports from several ships, it quickly moved northward and intensified into a Category 1 hurricane by midday on October 23. Around that time, the hurricane peaked with maximum sustained winds of 80 mph (130 km/h). The storm moved rapidly east-northeastward and was last noted about 180 mi (290 km) south-southwest of Sable Island late on October 24. Chenoweth considers this storm to have been an extratropical low that underwent a secondary extratropical cyclogenesis on October 24 just offshore South Carolina.

== See also ==
- Atlantic hurricane
- Atlantic hurricane reanalysis project
- Tropical cyclone observation
