= 1945 Homestead hurricane =

Category 4 Atlantic hurricane

Hurricane Nine
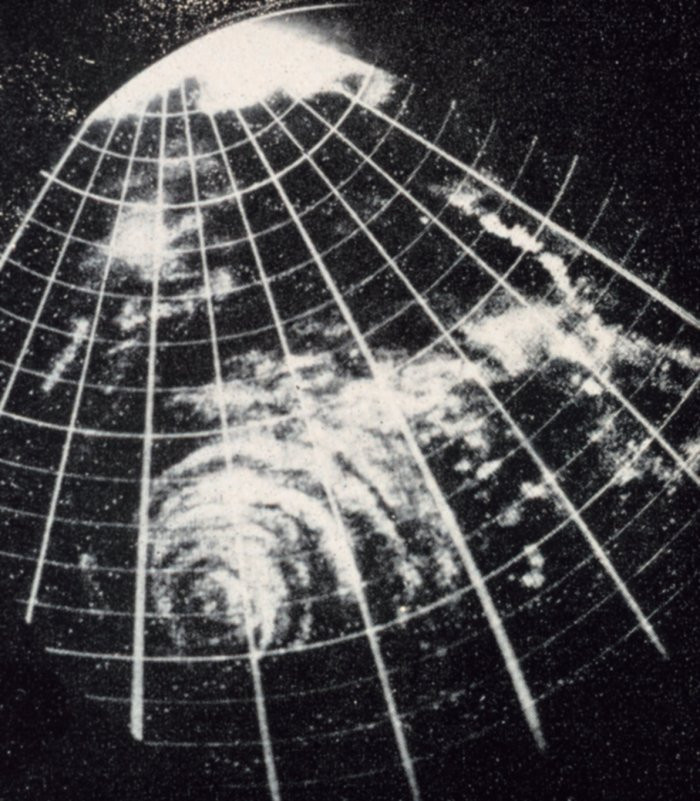
- Radar imagery of the hurricane over Florida at 05:00 UTC on September 16

Meteorological history
- Formed: September 12, 1945
- Extratropical: September 18, 1945
- Dissipated: September 20, 1945

Category 4 major hurricane
- 1-minute sustained (SSHWS/NWS)
- Highest winds: 130 mph (215 km/h)
- Highest gusts: 160 mph (260 km/h)
- Lowest pressure: 949 mbar (hPa); 28.02 inHg (estimated)

Overall effects
- Fatalities: 26 total
- Damage: $60 million (1945 USD)
- Areas affected: Leeward Islands; Turks and Caicos Islands; The Bahamas; Florida; Georgia; The Carolinas
- IBTrACS
- Part of the 1945 Atlantic hurricane season

The 1945 Homestead hurricane, known informally as Kappler's hurricane, was the most intense tropical cyclone to strike the U.S. state of Florida since 1935. The ninth tropical storm, third hurricane, and third major hurricane of the season, it developed east-northeast of the Leeward Islands on September 12. Moving briskly west-northwestward, the storm became a major hurricane on September 13. The system moved over the Turks and Caicos Islands the following day and then Andros on September 15. Later that day, the storm peaked as a Category 4 hurricane on the modern-day Saffir–Simpson scale with winds of 130 mph (215 km/h). Late on September 15, the hurricane made landfall on Key Largo and then in southern Dade County, Florida.

Thereafter, the hurricane began to weaken while moving across Florida, falling to Category 1 intensity only several hours after landfall late on September 15. Eventually, it curved north-northeastward and approached the east coast of Florida again. Late on September 16, the storm emerged into the Atlantic near St. Augustine and weakened to a tropical storm early on the following day. The cyclone made another landfall near the Georgia-South Carolina state line later on September 17. The system continued to weaken and transitioned into an extratropical cyclone near the border of North Carolina and Virginia early on September 18.

The storm caused significant damage and 22 deaths in the Turks and Caicos Islands and the Bahamas. In Florida, the hardest hit area was Dade County. Most of the city of Homestead was destroyed, while at the Naval Air Station Richmond, a fire ignited during the storm burned down three hangars worth $3 million (1945 USD) each. Throughout the state, the strong winds destroyed 1,632 residences and damaged 5,372 other homes. Four people died, including the fire chief of the Richmond station. In the Carolinas, the storm produced heavy rainfall, causing flash flooding, particularly along the Cape Fear River in North Carolina. Overall, the hurricane resulted in 26 fatalities and about $60 million in damage.

== Meteorological history ==
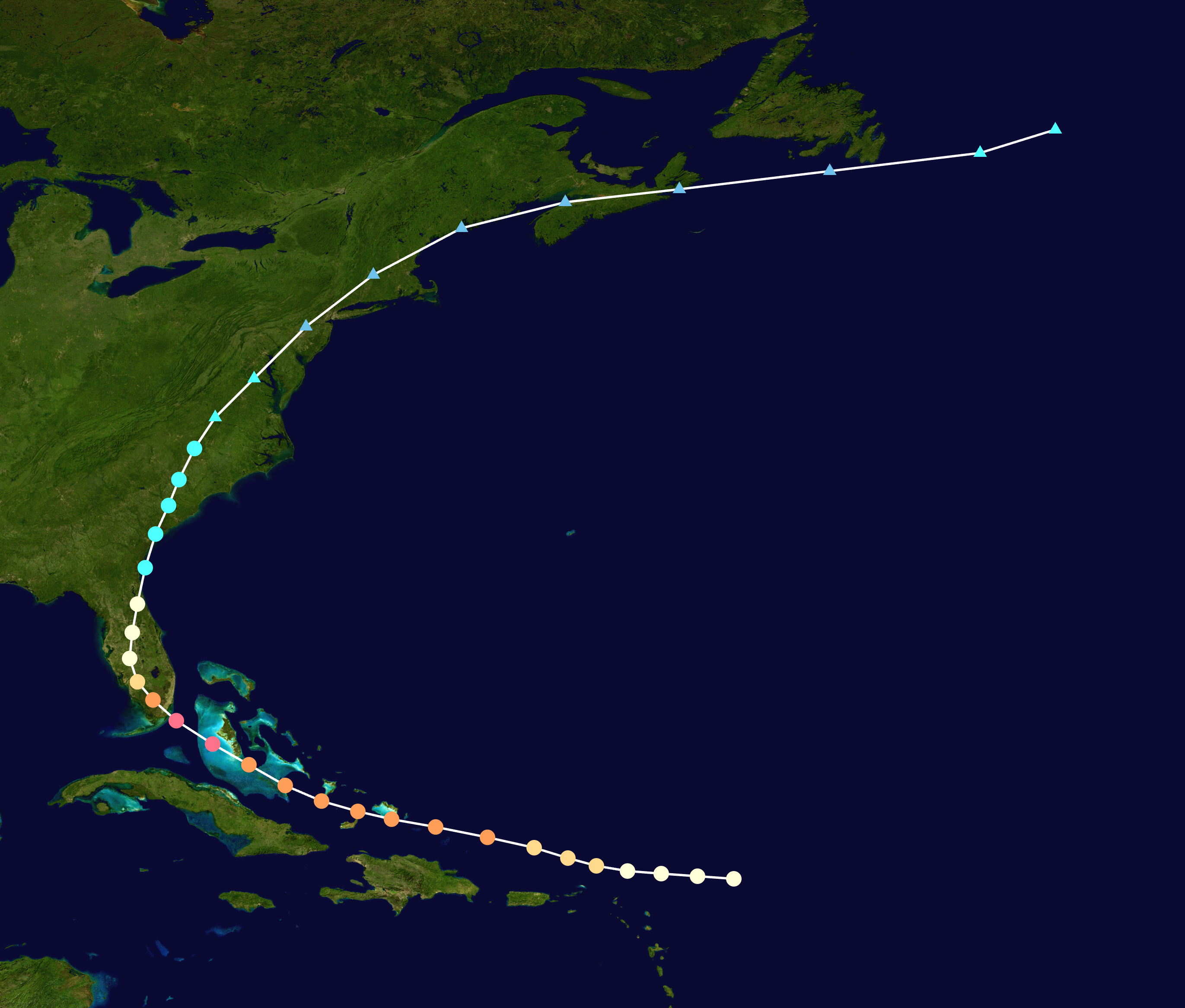
Map plotting the storm's track and intensity, according to the Saffir–Simpson scale Map key Saffir–Simpson scale Tropical depression (≤38 mph, ≤62 km/h) Tropical storm (39–73 mph, 63–118 km/h) Category 1 (74–95 mph, 119–153 km/h) Category 2 (96–110 mph, 154–177 km/h) Category 3 (111–129 mph, 178–208 km/h) Category 4 (130–156 mph, 209–251 km/h) Category 5 (≥157 mph, ≥252 km/h) Unknown Storm type Tropical cyclone Subtropical cyclone Extratropical cyclone, remnant low, tropical disturbance, or monsoon depression

The hurricane was first observed on September 12 about 235 miles (380 km) east-northeast of Barbuda in the Lesser Antilles. Around that time, the winds were estimated at 75 mph (120 km/h), and later that day, the Hurricane Hunters recorded peripheral winds of 54 mph (87 km/h). The storm quickly earned the moniker Kappler's hurricane, after the Hurricane Hunters' lead aerial forecaster, Lieutenant Bernard J. Kappler, who first noted the storm. Moving quickly to the west-northwest, the hurricane quickly intensified while passing north of Puerto Rico, reaching the equivalent of a modern-day major hurricane with winds of 115 mph (185 km/h) on September 13. The strength was based on another Hurricane Hunters mission reporting flight-level winds of 120 mph (190 km/h). After passing north of Hispaniola, the hurricane turned toward The Bahamas, approaching or passing over Grand Turk Island at 05:30 UTC on September 14. A station on the island observed a brief lull, along with a minimum barometric pressure of 28.83 inHg (976 mb), during the passage, and nearby Clarence Town reported winds of 105 mph (169 km/h). Gusts of 140 to 150 mph (230 to 240 km/h) were estimated to have impacted Grand Turk and Long islands. While moving through the Bahamas, the hurricane turned more to the northwest. Though quite intense, it was a smaller-than-average storm; it continued intensifying en route to southeastern Florida. At 13:00 UTC on September 15 reconnaissance aircraft entered the eye of the storm and registered a minimum central pressure of 28.29 inHg (958 mb).

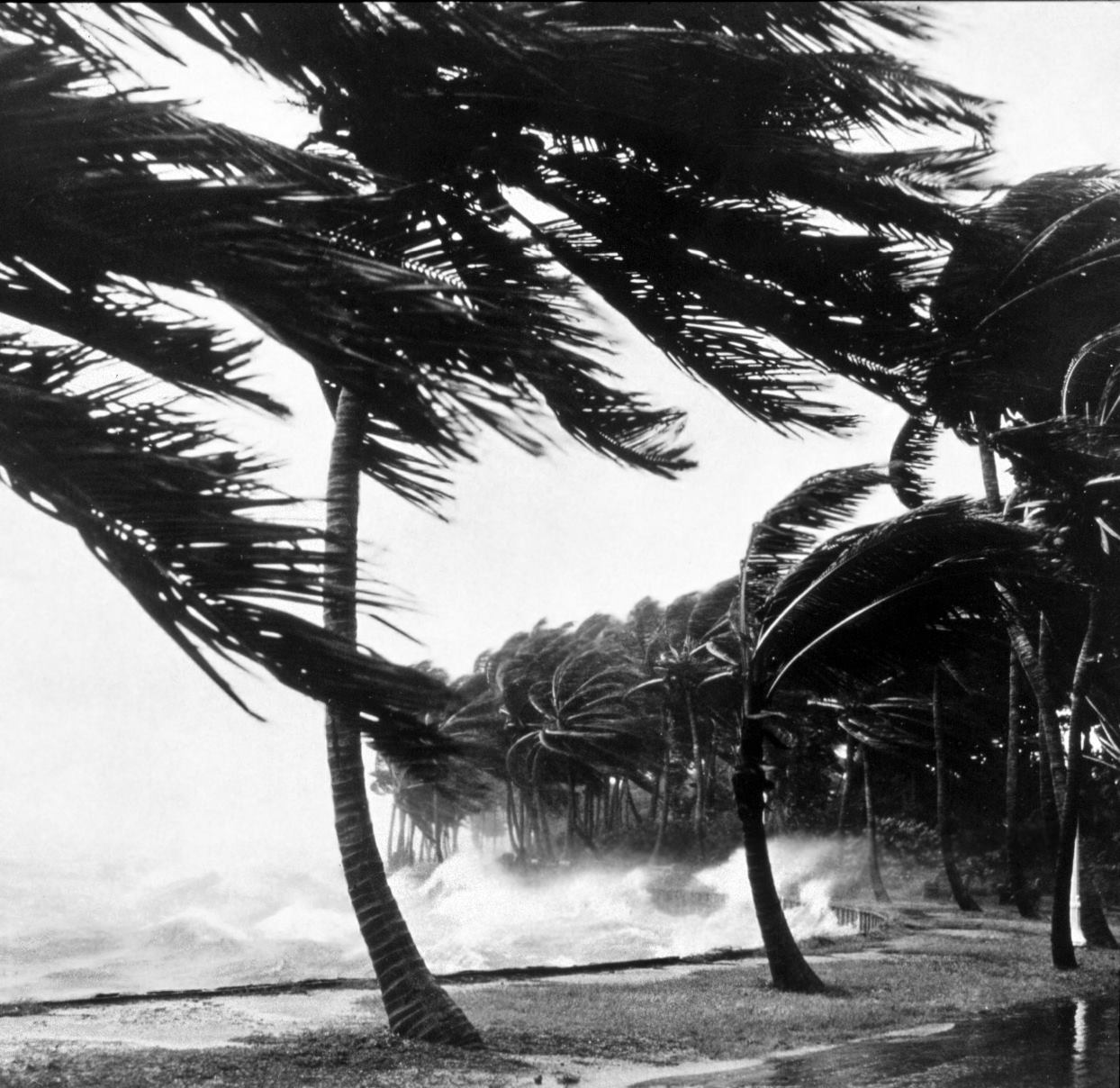
Photo showing the storm pounding the coast of Miami with hurricane force winds and heavy surf

At 19:30 UTC the hurricane made landfall on Key Largo, and about a half hour later struck the Florida mainland. The eye of the cyclone passed very close to Homestead Air Reserve Base about an hour after landfall, where a central barometric pressure of 28.09 inHg (951 mb) was recorded, along with a nearly hour-long period of calm conditions. The observation suggested a landfall pressure of 949 mbar (28.0 inHg), and based on the storm's small size, sustained winds of about 130 mph (215 km/h), equivalent to a Category 4 on the current Saffir–Simpson scale. This estimate was substantiated by a gust of 138 mph (222 km/h) at Carysfort Reef Light, on the weaker side of the storm. The hurricane weakened over Florida while curving to the north and north-northeast, although the proximity to water and the passage over the Everglades limited substantial weakening. Hurricane-force winds spread across much of Florida until the storm emerged into the western Atlantic near Ponte Vedra Beach early on September 17. At around 06:00 UTC, the hurricane weakened to tropical storm status. About 11 hours later, it made another landfall on Daufuskie Island, near the border between Georgia and South Carolina, with winds of 70 mph (110 km/h). After continuing through the southeast United States, the storm became extratropical near the border of North Carolina and Virginia midday on September 18. Although it initially maintained tropical storm-force winds, the former hurricane weakened below gale-force on September 19 while it was near Philadelphia. The storm continued rapidly to the northeast, moving through New England and along the coast of Maine before turning more to the east. Late on September 19, the storm moved across Nova Scotia, passing southeast of Newfoundland the next day. It was last observed late on September 20 dissipating to the east of Newfoundland.

== Preparations ==
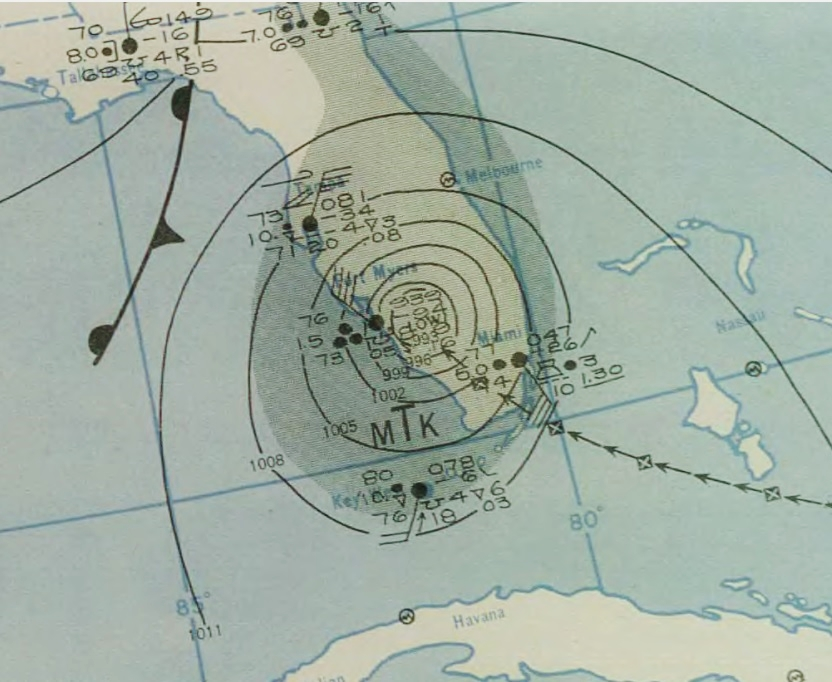
Surface weather analysis of the hurricane shortly after landfall on September 16

Although hurricane warnings were initially issued for the Leeward Islands, the cyclone passed north of the Lesser Antilles. In advance of the storm, aircraft were evacuated from the Naval Air Station in Miami, Florida, where hundreds of airplanes left vulnerable locations. Residents were advised to heed advisories in Florida, the Bahamas, and northern Cuba. On September 15, hurricane-force winds were expected to affect areas from Fort Lauderdale, Florida, through the Florida Keys, and hurricane warnings were accordingly released for this region. Storm warnings also extended north to Melbourne and Tampa. Military personnel sought shelter at Hialeah Race Track, while residents boarded homes and evacuated from coastal areas to public structures. Boats were utilized to transport people from barrier islands, and small watercraft were secured along the Miami River. However, Grady Norton, the head of the United States Weather Bureau, stated before the storm that Miami would "miss the worst of it". The American Red Cross reported that 25,000 people sought shelter within their services during the storm. Local officials from Cape Hatteras, North Carolina, to Brunswick, Georgia, ordered evacuations for coastal locations.

== Impact, aftermath, and records ==
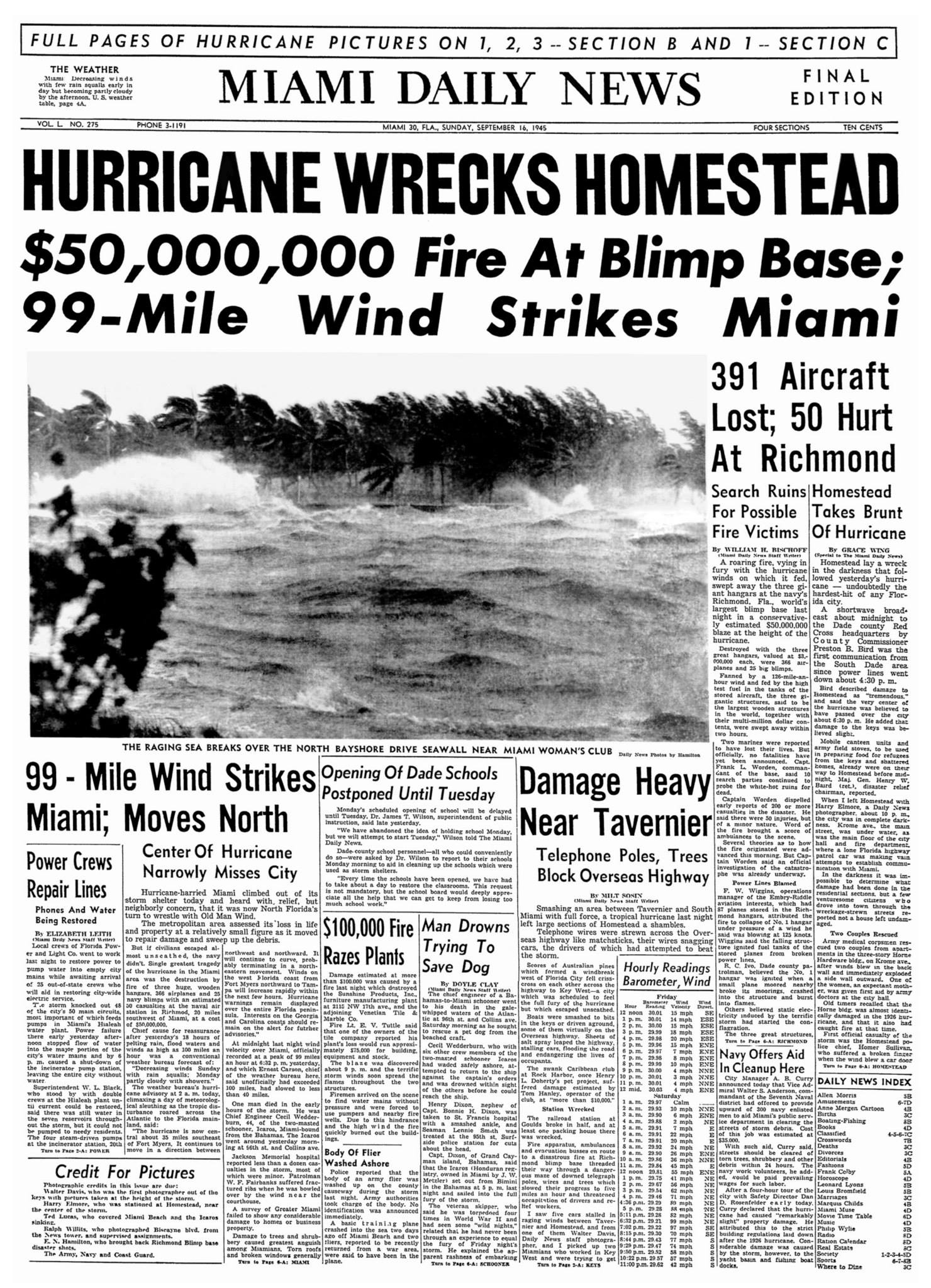
Front page of the Miami Daily News on September 16, regarding the impacts from the hurricane in Homestead

In the Bahamas and Turks and Caicos Islands, 22 people were killed. The hurricane demolished three-quarters of the structures on Grand Turk Island and caused at least some damage to the remainder. A number of sturdy structures that survived the 1926 and 1928 hurricanes collapsed; century-old trees were laid low and in some cases carried aloft. Some reports indicated that the storm was worse than that in 1926. The cyclone also produced heavy damage on Acklins, Crooked Island, Long Cay, and Long Island, though damages were not reported in Nassau. Numerous homes on the southern tip of Andros were flattened as well. Peak gusts were estimated near 40 mph (64 km/h) in Nassau. After the storm, The Daily Gleaner, in Kingston, Jamaica, initiated a fund to offer aid for residents in the Turks and Caicos Islands.

In South Florida, peak gusts were estimated near 150 mph (240 km/h) at the Army Air Base in Homestead. The strong winds destroyed 1,632 residences across the state, while 5,372 homes received damages. Four deaths were confirmed statewide.

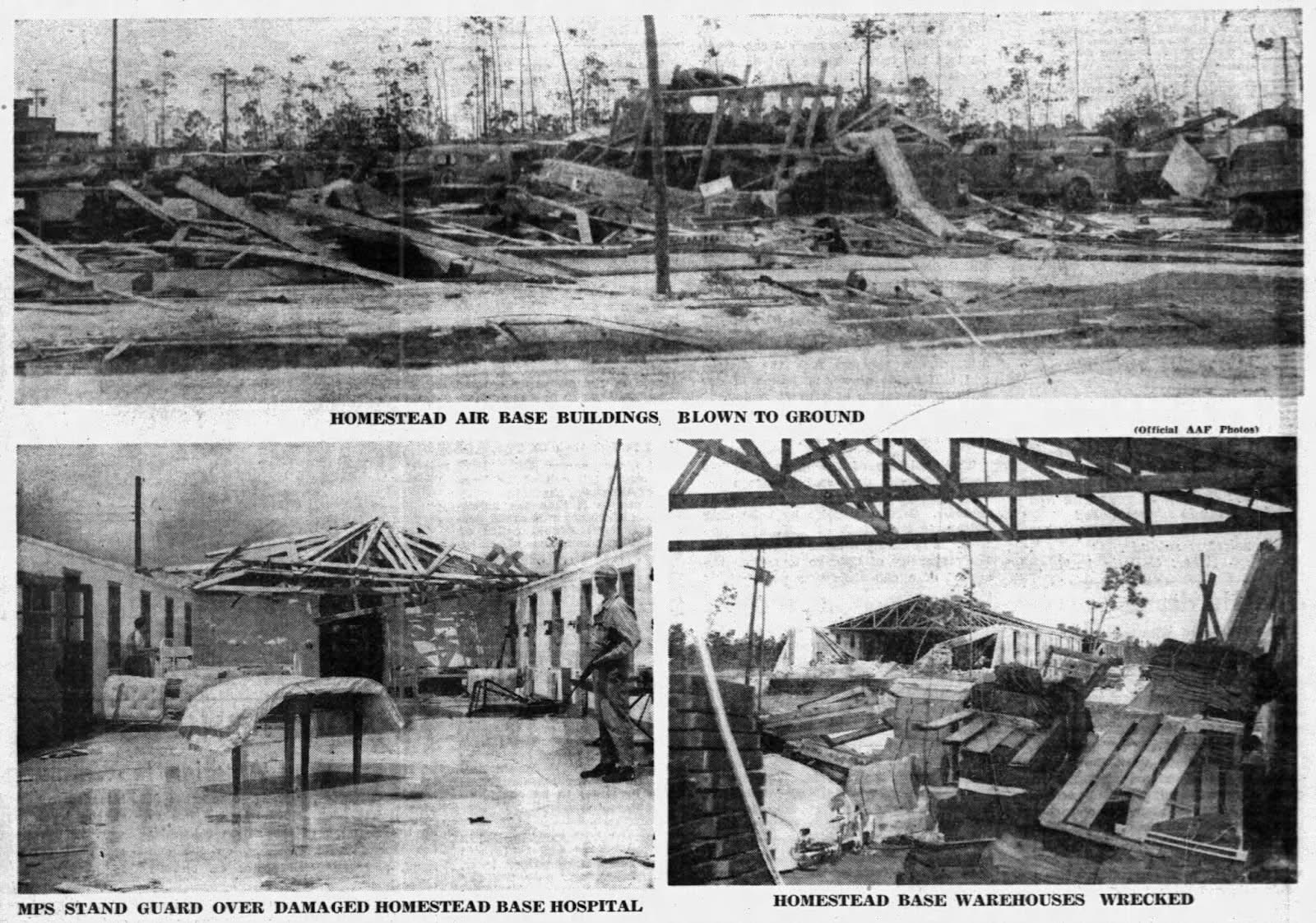
A college of damage photos from the hurricane in Homestead

The storm was described as the most significant to impact Greater Miami since the 1926 Miami hurricane, but its worst impacts were confined to a comparatively narrower area and were not as severe overall. In Miami, gusts reached 107 mph (172 km/h), and damages were minimal, mostly snapped power lines, compared to communities in southern Dade County. Damages to the Miami area was estimated at $40 million. Blown-off roofs were strewn across a flooded Collins Avenue during the storm, and several watercraft were stranded near Mary Street. An additional fire also destroyed a furniture factory and a tile manufacturing plant in the northwestern portion of downtown Miami. One death was reported in the area, the fire chief of Richmond's fire department, and 26 required hospitalization. Another death was recorded after a schooner ran aground in present-day Bal Harbour, Florida, killing its chief engineer.

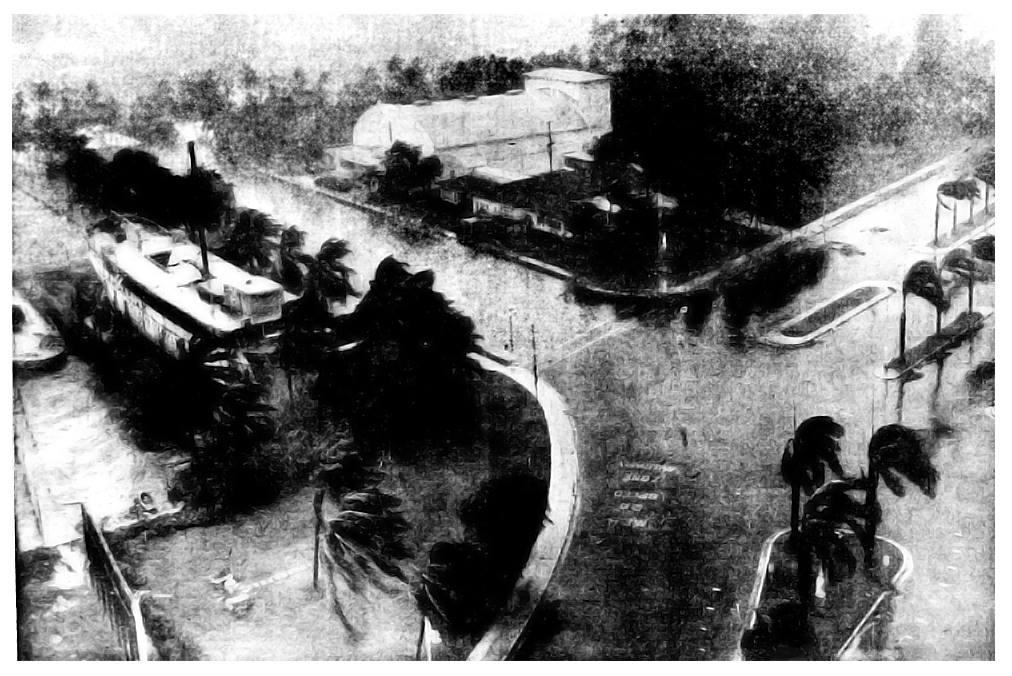
A view from the Miami News Tower (now known as the Freedom Tower) in downtown Miami shows increasing winds from the hurricane

The storm's most adverse impacts occurred in a 40-mile-wide (64 km) swath across southern Dade County, principally affecting the communities of Goulds, Redlands, South Miami, Perrine, Kendall, Princeton, Richmond, Homestead, and Florida City. Homestead was mostly flooded underwater, with the first floor of city hall and the fire department completely flooded and nearly all its residences damaged. The historical Horde Hardware building collapsed while a local church was flattened by the winds. Unofficially winds at Homestead Army Air Corps Base reached 145 mph (233 km/h), virtually destroying the airbase. Numerous structures were flattened, including the base exchange, the nurses' dormitory, and enlisted housing facilities. Building 741, the so-called "Big Hangar", was unroofed. The fire station and base laundry were deemed irreparable. The few aircraft left intact were reportedly "tossed about like leaves." At Cutler Ridge a 13.7-foot-high (4.2 m) storm tide was reported. The Florida East Coast Railway station at Goulds collapsed. Crop losses at Homestead were estimated to be $4 million and most of its avocado harvest was destroyed. Dozens of felled Australian pines impeded traffic near Florida City.

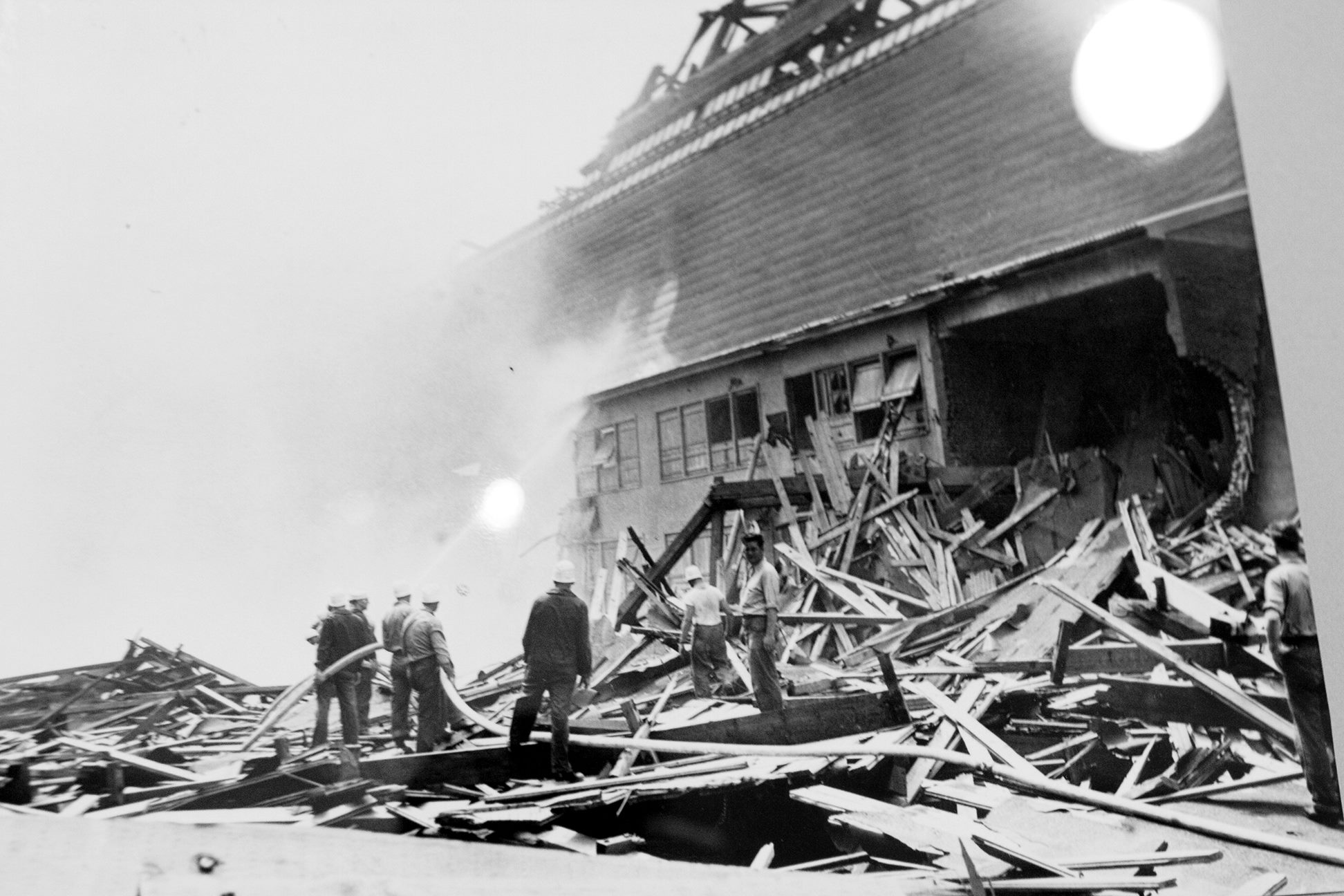
The Naval Air Station Richmond in Florida sustained significant damage from a large fire during the hurricane

Nearly 200 people were injured at the Naval Air Station (NAS) Richmond, when a fire ignited during the storm, affecting three large hangars worth $3 million each and destroying 150 automobiles, 366 airplanes, and 25 blimps; losses at the base were greater than at any other single point in Florida as a result of the storm, owing mostly to the destruction of the hangars. At the NAS Richmond, an anemometer unofficially registered sustained winds of 170 mph (270 km/h) for a couple of minutes, along with a peak gust of 196 mph (315 km/h); these values were not officially accepted as reliable. Based on structural damage peak gusts at the base were believed to have exceeded 161 mph (259 km/h), equivalent to low-end Category 5 status on the Saffir–Simpson scale. Steel-framed doors at the NAS incurred structural deformation, which engineers deemed to be consistent with sustained winds of 125–130 mph (201–209 km/h)—an estimate later incorporated into a reanalysis of the storm.

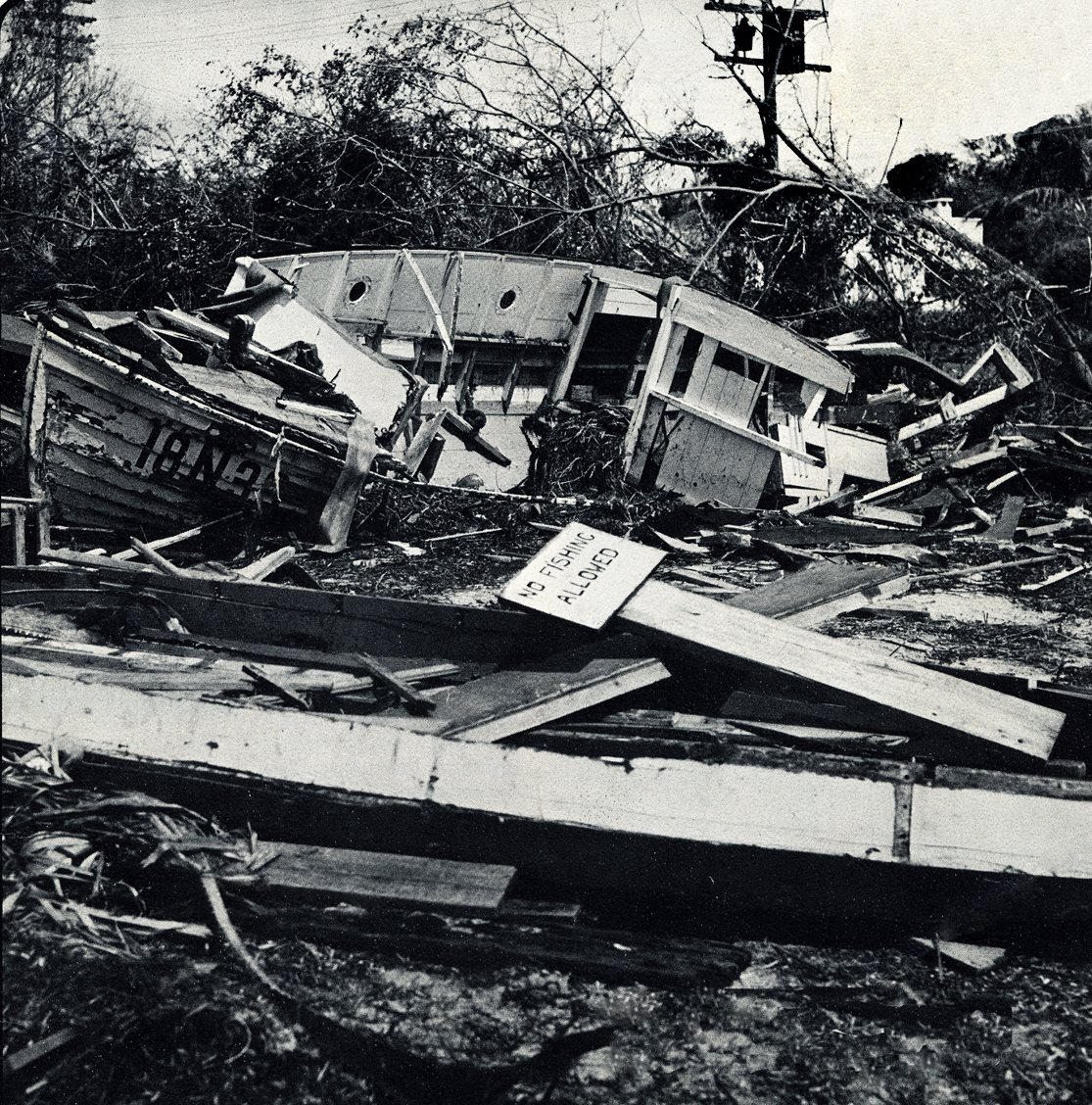
A destroyed structure at Coconut Grove in Miami after the hurricane

In the Florida Keys, hundreds of residences were damaged. On the Overseas Highway a number of boats were grounded and utility poles downed. An elevated weather station at Carysfort Reef observed sustained winds of 130 mph (210 km/h), suggesting sustained winds of 117 mph (188 km/h) at standard elevation relative to sea level. (Note: The Saffir–Simpson scale uses an elevation of 10 m (33 ft) above mean sea level.)

Minor reports of damage was reported in Central and Northern Florida, with St. Augustine reporting a 70-mile-per-hour (110 km/h) wind gust. In Charleston, South Carolina, strong winds caused high waves, but the storm arrived at low tide and produced modest damage. An estimated F2 tornado wrecked a logging camp at Gourdin, leaving mattresses in treetops, killing one person, injuring a few others, and causing $100,000 in losses. Rainfall peaked at 8.0 inches (200 mm) at Belton. In Aiken, heavy precipitation caused damage to unpaved streets. Inland, the system produced heavy rainfall over North Carolina, peaking at 14.8 inches (380 mm) in Rockingham, North Carolina, in the period covering September 13–18. Laurinburg reported total rainfall of 11.2 inches (280 mm).

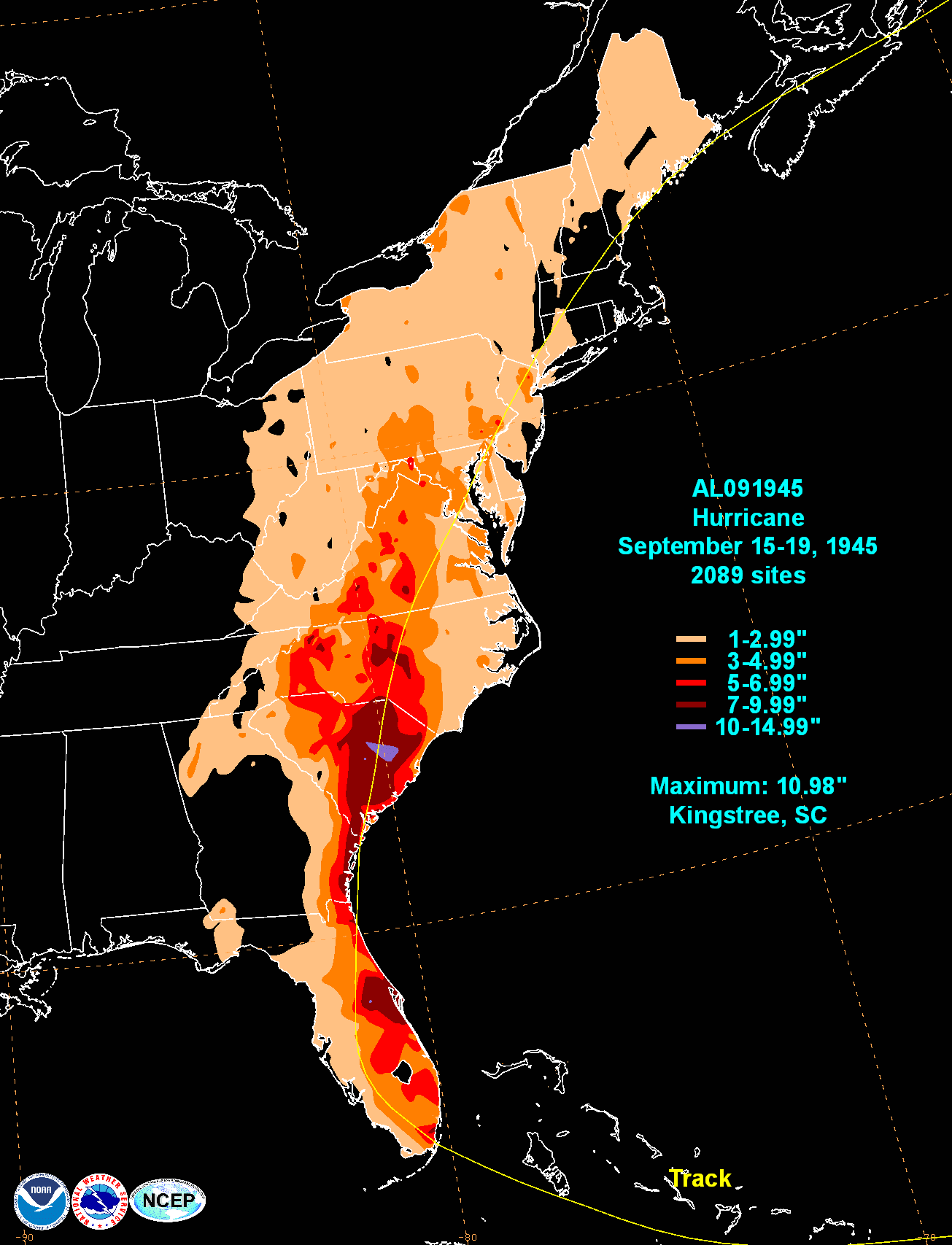
Rainfall totals from the hurricane in the United States

This rain led to saturated grounds, allowing new water to spill into streams. Many crop fields and dwellings were flooded near the Cape Fear River as levels rose to record heights. The towns of Moncure, Fayetteville, and Elizabethtown exceeded flood stage levels. Broken dams in Richmond County produced significant flash floods. Few deaths were reported, but economic losses were extensive. In Hopewell, New Jersey, the remnants of the system produced winds of 50 mph (80 km/h), though major damage was not reported.

In the aftermath of the storm, more than 1,000 Red Cross workers were activated in response to the cyclone. A force of 400 German prisoners of war and 200 Bahamian laborers participated in the cleanup process.

Land-based radar at Orlando, Florida, detected the eye of the storm at 05:00 UTC on September 16. When the radar image was taken, it was only the third time in history that a hurricane passed close enough to a radar site to reveal its structure. In 1992 Homestead and its vicinity would once again be severely affected by a tropical cyclone, Hurricane Andrew. A home, sited in Homestead, that was erected in the same year as the 1945 hurricane later registered the lowest pressure associated with Andrew to be measured on land in South Florida. During landfall the 1945 storm was comparable to Andrew track-, size-, and damage-wise.

== See also ==
- 1926 Miami hurricane – Hit Dade County as a strong Category 4, devastating Greater Miami
- Hurricane Andrew – Also made landfall on southern Dade County, producing catastrophic impacts in the same area
- Hurricane King – Brought the strongest winds to Downtown Miami since 1926
- Hurricane Betsy – Impacted the northernmost Florida Keys and southern Dade County as a major hurricane
- List of Florida hurricanes

== Sources ==
- Barnes, Jay (1998). Florida's Hurricane History (1st ed.). Chapel Hill, North Carolina: UNC Press. ISBN 0-8078-2443-7 – via Internet Archive.
- Grazulis, Thomas P. (November 1990). Significant Tornadoes 1880–1989. Vol. 2. St. Johnsbury, Vermont: The Tornado Project of Environmental Films. ISBN 1-879362-02-3.
  - — (July 1993). Significant Tornadoes 1680–1991: A Chronology and Analysis of Events. St. Johnsbury, Vermont: The Tornado Project of Environmental Films. ISBN 978-1879362031.
- Harris, D. Lee (1963). Characteristics of the Hurricane Storm Surge (PDF) (Technical report). Weather Bureau Technical Papers. Washington, D.C.: United States Weather Bureau. 48, Characteristics of the Hurricane Storm Surge.
- Hudgins, James E. (2000). Written at Blacksburg, Virginia. Tropical Cyclones Affecting North Carolina since 1566 – An Historical Perspective. NOAA Seattle Library (Technical report). National Weather Service (NWS) Technical Memos. Seattle: National Weather Service. ER-92, Tropical Cyclones Affecting North Carolina. Archived from the original on 11 March 2007.
- International Best Track Archive for Climate Stewardship (IBTrACS) (September 2022). IBTrACS browser (hosted by UNC Asheville) (Report). National Centers for Environmental Information – via World Data Center for Meteorology.
- Neely, Wayne (2019). The Greatest and Deadliest Hurricanes to Impact the Bahamas. Cheyenne, Wyoming: UrLink. ISBN 978-1-64753-121-8.
- Norton, Grady (September 1945). Written at Jacksonville, Florida. Bennett, William J. (ed.). "The Hurricane of September 11–20, 1945". Florida section. Climatological Data. 49 (9). Washington, D.C.: United States Weather Bureau: 54.
- Schoner, R. W.; Molansky, S. (July 1956). Rainfall Associated with Hurricanes (and Other Tropical Disturbances) (PDF) (Technical report). National Hurricane Research Project. Washington, D.C.: United States Weather Bureau. 3, Rainfall Associated with Hurricanes – via Weather Prediction Center.
- Simiu, Emil; Vickery, Peter; Kareem, Ahsan (July 2007). "Relation Between Saffir-Simpson Hurricane Scale Wind Speeds and Peak 3-s Gust Speeds Over Open Terrain". Journal of Structural Engineering. Technical Notes. 133 (7). Reston, Virginia: 1043–5. doi:10.1061/(ASCE)0733-9445(2007)133:7(1043).
- Sumner, H. C. (January 1946). Culnan, Robert N. (ed.). "North Atlantic Hurricanes and Tropical Disturbances of 1946". Monthly Weather Review. 74 (1). Washington, D.C.: 1–5. doi:10.1175/1520-0493(1946)074<0001:MACDFJ>2.0.CO;2.
- Tannehill, I. R. (1952) [1938]. Hurricanes: Their Nature and History (8th ed.). Princeton, New Jersey: Princeton University Press. OCLC 3024697 – via Internet Archive.
- United States Army Corps of Engineers (2 January 1958) [1945]. Storm Rainfall in the United States: Depth-Area-Duration Data. War Department – via Internet Archive.
