= Grady Norton =

American meteorologist (1894–1954)

Grady Norton (1894 – October 9, 1954) was an American meteorologist. He is widely recognized as the original director of the National Hurricane Center even though that position would not be created during his lifetime.

The son of a farmer, Norton was born in Womack Hill, Alabama. Due to a boll weevil infestation at his family farm in Choctaw County, Alabama around 1915, Grady was forced to leave the farming life and get a job. He was drafted into the Army near the end of World War I, and later attended a Signal Corps' meteorology program at Texas A&M College.

After Congress appropriated funding for four hurricane forecast centers in 1935, Norton became the chief forecaster of the Jacksonville office. He was able to issue hurricane warnings more than twelve hours in advance when the 1935 Labor Day hurricane hit South Florida.

In 1943 the forecast center was moved to Miami, Florida to establish a joint hurricane warning service with the United States Army Air Corps and the United States Navy. Norton remained as the center's chief forecaster.

During the later decades of his life he suffered from high blood pressure. He died in 1954 after a twelve-hour stint forecasting for Hurricane Hazel, and was succeeded by his understudy, Gordon Dunn.
