= List of Atlantic hurricane seasons =

This is a list of Atlantic hurricane seasons, which covers the annual cycle of tropical cyclone formation in the Atlantic Ocean. Historical records of hurricane seasons date back to the 1800s, and these hurricanes and tropical storms can affect Central America, the United States, and Canada. The Atlantic hurricane season runs from June 1 to November 30, and this period is when most tropical activity occurs, with the peak occurring in September. Although storms can form outside of these months as well.

== 1494–1850 (pre-HURDAT era) ==
Period	Seasons	Individual years
Pre-19th century	Pre-17th century (pre 1600), 17th century (1600s), 18th century (1700s)	1780
1800–1850	1800–1809, 1810–1819, 1820–1829, 1830–1839, 1840–1849	1842, 1850.

== 1851–1899 (within HURDAT data) ==
=== 1850s ===
Year	TS	H	MH	ACE	Deaths	Strongest storm	Major landfalling storms	Notes
1851	6	3	1	36.24	24	3 "San Agapito"	3 "San Agapito"	First Atlantic hurricane season to be included in the HURDAT.
1852	5	5	1	73.28	100+	3 "Great Mobile"	3 "Great Mobile"	One of three seasons in which all known cyclones became hurricanes.
1853	8	4	2	76.49	40	4 Three		Earliest known Category 4 hurricane on the Saffir-Simpson scale.
1854	5	3	1	31.00	30+	3 "South Carolina"	3 "South Carolina"	
1855	5	4	1	18.12	Unknown	3 "Middle Gulf Shore"	3 "Middle Gulf Shore"	
1856	6	4	2	48.94	200+	4 "Last Island"	3 "Southeastern States"; 4 "Last Island"	
1857	4	3	0	46.84	424	2 SS Central America Disaster; 2 Four	2 SS Central America Disaster	
1858	6	6	0	44.79	None	2 Three; 2 Six	2 Hurricane Three	One of three seasons in which all known cyclones became hurricanes.
1859	8	7	1	55.73	Numerous	3 Six	1 Hurricane Five; 3 Hurricane Six; 1 Hurricane Eight	

=== 1860s ===
Year	TS	H	MH	ACE	Deaths	Strongest storm	Major landfalling storms	Notes
1860	7	6	1	62.06	60+	3 One	3 Hurricane One	
1861	8	6	0	49.71	22+	2 One; 2 Three	1 "Key West"; 1 "Expedition"	
1862	6	3	0	46.03	3	2 Two; 2 Three		
1863	9	5	0	50.35	90	2 "Amanda"	2 "Amanda"	
1864	5	3	0	26.55	None	1 One; 1 Three; 1 Five		
1865	7	3	0	49.13	326	2 Four; 2 Seven	2 Hurricane Four	
1866	7	6	1	83.65	383	4 "Nassau"	4 "Nassau"	
1867	9	7	1	59.97	811	3 "San Narciso"	3 "San Narciso"	
1868	4	3	0	34.65	2	2 One; 2 Two; 2 Four		
1869	10	7	1	51.02	38	3 New England Gale	3 New England Gale; 2 Saxby Gale	

=== 1870s ===
Year	TS	H	MH	ACE	Deaths	Strongest storm	Major landfalling storms	Notes
1870	11	10	2	87.80	2,052	3 Four	3 "First Key West"; 2 "Second Key West"	
1871	8	6	2	88.39	30	3 Three; 3 "Santa Juana"	3 Hurricane Three; 3 "Santa Juana"	
1872	5	4	0	65.38	Unknown	2 Two		
1873	5	3	2	69.47	626	3 "Central Florida"	3 "Central Florida"	
1874	7	4	0	47.05	Unknown	2 Seven		
1875	6	5	1	72.48	800	3 "Indianola"	3 "Indianola"	
1876	5	4	2	56.05	19	3 "San Felipe"	3 "San Felipe"; 3 "Cuba-South Florida"	
1877	8	3	1	73.36	34	3 "Florida Panhandle"	3 "Florida Panhandle"	
1878	12	10	2	180.85	108	4 Seven	2 Gale of 1878	First known above-average season (in modern-day terms)
1879	8	6	2	63.63	47	3 "Louisiana"	3 "Great Beaufort"; 3 "Louisiana"	

=== 1880s ===
Year	TS	H	MH	ACE	Deaths	Strongest storm	Major landfalling storms	Notes
1880	11	9	2	131.08	133	4 Eight	4 Hurricane Two	
1881	7	4	0	59.25	700	2 "Georgia"	2 "Georgia"	
1882	6	4	2	59.47	6	4 "Cuba"	3 "Pensacola"; 4 "Cuba"	
1883	4	3	2	66.70	236	3 Two	3 "Bahamas-North Carolina"	
1884	4	4	1	72.06	8	3 Two		
1885	8	6	0	58.30	25	2 Two		
1886	12	10	4	166.17	200+	4 "Indianola"	4 "Indianola"; 3 "Cuba"; 3 "Texas-Louisiana"	Seven hurricanes struck the United States, the most during a single year.
1887	19	11	2	181.26	2	3 Seven		Record five off-season storms.
1888	9	6	2	84.95	924	3 "San Gil"	3 "Louisiana"; 3 "San Gil"	
1889	9	6	0	104.04	40	2 Six		

=== 1890s ===
Year	TS	H	MH	ACE	Deaths	Strongest storm	Major landfalling storms	Notes
1890	4	2	1	33.35	14	3 Three		
1891	10	7	1	116.11	700+	3 "Martinique"	3 "Martinique"	
1892	9	5	0	115.84	16	2 Three; 2 Five; 2 Seven		
1893	12	10	5	231.15	4,028	4 "Cheniere Caminada"	3 "San Roque"; 3 "New York"; 3 "Sea Islands"; 3 "Charleston"; 4 "Cheniere Caminada"	Two hurricanes caused more than 2,000 deaths in the United States. Four simultaneous hurricanes on August 22, one of two times on record.
1894	7	5	4	135.42	200+	4 Six	3 "Florida Panhandle"	
1895	6	2	0	68.77	56	2 Two		
1896	7	6	2	136.08	286	3 "Cedar Keys"	3 "San Ramón"; 3 "Cedar Keys"	
1897	6	3	0	54.54	262	2 One		
1898	11	5	1	113.24	562	4 "Georgia"	4 "Georgia"	
1899	10	5	2	151.03	4,167	4 "San Ciríaco"	4 "San Ciríaco"	The San Ciríaco hurricane was the longest-lasting Atlantic hurricane on record

== 1900s ==
NOTE: In the following tables, all estimates of damage costs are expressed in contemporaneous US dollars (USD).

=== 1900s ===
Year	Map	TS	H	MH	ACE	Deaths	Damage	Strongest storm	Major landfalling storms	Notes
1900		7	3	2	83.35	8,000+	$35.4M	4 "Galveston"	4 "Galveston"	The Galveston hurricane was the deadliest disaster in the United States.
1901		13	6	0	98.98	35-40	$1M	2 Seven	1 "Louisiana"	
1902		5	3	0	32.65	5	Unknown	2 Four		
1903		10	7	1	102.07	222	$18.5M	3 "Jamaica"	3 "Jamaica"; 1 "Florida"; 2 "New Jersey"	
1904		6	4	0	30.35	112	$2.5M	1 Two	1 One	
1905		5	1	1	28.38	8	Unknown	3 Four		
1906		11	6	3	162.88	381	$25.4M	4 Four	3 "Mississippi"; 3 "Florida Keys"	
1907		5	0	0	13.06	0	Unknown	TS One		One of two seasons with no recorded hurricanes, the other being 1914.
1908		10	6	1	95.11	37	Unknown	3 Six		Includes the only known March tropical cyclone in the basin.
1909		12	6	4	93.34	4,673	$77.3M	3 "Grand Isle"	3 "Velasco"; 3 "Monterrey"; 3 "Grand Isle"; 3 "Florida Keys"; 2 "Greater Antilles"	

=== 1910s ===
Year	Map	TS	H	MH	ACE	Deaths	Damage	Strongest storm	Major landfalling storms	Notes
1910		5	3	1	63.90	100	$1.25M	4 "Cuba"	4 "Cuba"	
1911		6	3	0	34.29	27	$3M	2 Three		
1912		7	4	1	57.26	116	$1.6M	3 "Jamaica"	3 "Jamaica"	
1913		6	4	0	35.60	5	$4M	1 Four		
1914		1	0	0	2.53	0	Unknown	TS One		Least active season on record. One of two seasons with no recorded hurricanes, along with 1907.
1915		6	5	3	130.10	675	$63M	4 "New Orleans"	4 "Galveston"; 4 "New Orleans"	Two Category 4 hurricanes made landfall in the United States.
1916		15	10	5	144.01	31	$5.9M	4 "Texas"	3 "Gulf Coast"; 3 "Charleston"; 4 "Texas"	
1917		4	2	2	60.67	76	$170,000	4 "Nueva Gerona"	4 "Nueva Gerona"	
1918		6	4	1	39.87	55	$5M	3 "Louisiana"	3 "Louisiana"	
1919		5	2	1	55.04	828	$22M	4 "Florida Keys"	4 "Florida Keys"	

=== 1920s ===
Year	Map	TS	H	MH	ACE	Deaths	Damage	Strongest storm	Major landfalling storms	Notes
1920		5	4	0	29.81	1	$1.5M	2 "Louisiana"	2 "Louisiana"	
1921		7	5	2	86.53	6	$36.5M	4 "Tampa Bay"	3 "San Pedro"; 4 "Tampa Bay"	
1922		5	3	1	54.52	105	$2.3M	3 Two		
1923		9	4	1	49.31	15	$1.3M	3 Five		
1924		11	5	2	100.19	179	Unknown	5 "Cuba"	5 "Cuba"	First official Category 5 Atlantic hurricane on the Saffir–Simpson scale.
1925		4	1	0	7.25	59+	$19.9M	1 One	TS "Florida"	
1926		11	8	6	229.56	1,448	$247.4M	4 "Miami"	4 "Nassau"; 3 "Nova Scotia"; 3 "Louisiana"; 4 "Miami"; 4 "Havana–Bermuda"	
1927		8	4	1	56.48	184	Unknown	3 "Nova Scotia"	3 "Nova Scotia"	
1928		6	4	1	83.48	4,289	$102M	5 "Okeechobee"	5 "Okeechobee"	Least active season that featured a category 5 hurricane, tied with 1977. One of four seasons to have a category 5 as the sole major hurricane of the season.
1929		5	3	1	48.07	62	$10.0M	4 "Bahamas"	4 "Bahamas"	

=== 1930s ===
Year	Map	TS	H	MH	ACE	Deaths	Damage	Strongest storm	Major landfalling storms	Notes
1930		3	2	2	49.77	8,000	$50M	4 "San Zenón"	4 "San Zenón"	The San Zenón hurricane was the fifth deadliest on record. Second least active season in terms of tropical storms.
1931		13	3	1	47.84	2,502	$7.5M	4 "British Honduras"	4 "British Honduras"	
1932		15	6	4	169.66	3,315	$37M	5 "Cuba"	4 "Freeport"; 5 "Bahamas"; 4 "San Ciprián"; 5 "Cuba"	Only season with a Category 5 hurricane in November, which was the longest lasting category 5, at 3.6 days. First season to have multiple Category 5 hurricanes.
1933		20	11	6	258.57	651	$86.6M	5 "Tampico"	4 "Chesapeake–Potomac"; 5 "Cuba–Brownsville"; 4 "Treasure Coast"; 4 "Outer Banks"; 5 "Tampico"	Most active Atlantic hurricane season on record at the time, later surpassed by 2005; Currently the fourth most active Atlantic hurricane season on record Highest Accumulated Cyclone Energy (ACE) in an Atlantic season on record.
1934		13	7	1	79.07	2,017	$4.26M	3 Thirteen		
1935		8	5	3	106.21	2,604	$12.5M	5 "Labor Day"	5 "Labor Day"; 4 "Cuba"	Most intense landfalling Atlantic hurricane known to date ("Labor Day").
1936		17	7	1	99.78	5	$1.23M	3 "Mid-Atlantic"		
1937		11	4	1	65.85	0	Unknown	3 Six		
1938		9	4	2	77.58	~700	$290.3M	5 "New England"	5 "New England"	Earliest-starting season on record (January 3).
1939		6	3	1	43.68	5	Unknown	4 Five		

=== 1940s ===
Year	Map	TS	H	MH	ACE	Deaths	Damage	Strongest storm	Major landfalling storms	Notes
1940		9	6	0	67.79	101	$4.7M	2 "New England"	2 "South Carolina"	
1941		6	4	3	51.77	63	$10M	4 "Nicaragua"	3 "Texas"; 4 "Nicaragua"; 3 "Florida"	
1942		11	4	1	62.49	17	$30.6M	3 "Matagorda"	3 "Matagorda"	
1943		10	5	2	94.01	19	$17.2M	4 Three	2 "Surprise"	First year of hurricane hunters.
1944		14	8	3	104.45	1,153	$202M	5 "Great Atlantic"	5 "Great Atlantic"; 4 "Cuba–Florida"	Great Atlantic hurricane was the only Category 5 of the entire decade
1945		11	5	2	63.42	80	$80M	4 "Homestead"	3 "Texas"; 4 "Homestead"	
1946		7	3	0	19.61	5	$5.2M	2 Four	2 "Florida"	
1947		10	5	2	88.49	94	$145.3M	4 "Fort Lauderdale"	4 "Fort Lauderdale" (George); 2 "Cape Sable" (King)	First year of internal Atlantic tropical cyclone naming.
1948		10	6	4	94.98	94	$30.9M	4 "Florida"; 4 "Bermuda-Newfoundland"	4 "Florida" (Easy); 3 "Miami" (Fox)	
1949		16	7	2	96.45	3	$58.2M	4 "Florida"	4 "Florida"; 2 "Texas"	

=== 1950s ===
Year	Map	TS	H	MH	ACE	Deaths	Damage	Strongest storm	Retired names	Notes
1950		16	11	6	211.28	20	$37M	4 Dog	None	First year of external Atlantic tropical cyclone naming Record-breaking 8 tropical storms in October.
1951		12	8	3	126.33	257	$80M	4 Easy	None	
1952		11	5	2	69.08	607	$3.75M	4 Fox	None	Includes the only known February tropical cyclone in the basin.
1953		14	7	3	98.51	1	$6M	5 Carol	None	First year of female names for storms. One of only 4 seasons to have both a preseason and postseason storm. Carol was one of seven Category 5 hurricanes whose name was not retired (Carol was retired in 1954 as a Category 3)
1954		16	7	3	110.88	1,069	$752M	4 Hazel	3 Carol; 3 Edna; 4 Hazel	Includes Alice, one of two storms in the basin to span two calendar years.
1955		13	9	4	158.17	1,518	$1.2bn	5 Janet	4 Connie; 2 Diane; 4 Ione; 5 Janet	
1956		12	4	1	56.67	76	$67.8M	3 Betsy	None	
1957		8	3	2	78.66	513	$152.5M	4 Carrie	3 Audrey	First of only three seasons to feature a major hurricane in June.
1958		12	7	3	109.69	41	$12M	4 Helene	None	
1959		14	7	2	77.11	59	$23.3M	4 Gracie	None	
Total		128	68	29	1096.38	4,161	$2.54bn	Janet	8 names	

=== 1960s ===
Year	Map	TS	H	MH	ACE	Deaths	Damage	Strongest storm	Retired names	Notes
1960		8	4	2	72.90	455	$442.34M	4 Donna	4 Donna	
1961		12	8	5	188.89	345	$392M	5 Hattie	4 Carla; 5 Hattie	Two Category 5 hurricanes. Lowest number of named storms for an extremely active season. Esther was one of seven Category 5 hurricanes whose name was not retired
1962		7	4	0	50.45	39	>$4.88M	2 Ella	None	
1963		10	7	3	112.09	7,225	$589M	4 Flora	4 Flora	Flora was the sixth-deadliest hurricane on record.
1964		13	7	5	153.04	261	$605M	4 Cleo	4 Cleo; 4 Dora; 4 Hilda	
1965		10	4	1	86.74	76	$1.45bn	4 Betsy	4 Betsy	Betsy became the first Atlantic tropical cyclone to inflict at least $1 billion USD in damages.
1966		15	7	3	138.68	1,094	$410M	5 Inez	5 Inez	Second of only three seasons to feature a major hurricane in June.
1967		13	6	1	125.43	64	$217M	5 Beulah	5 Beulah	First hurricane season in the modern satellite era. Features the highest number of tropical depressions in a season at the time. One of four seasons to have a category 5 as the sole major hurricane of the season.
1968		9	5	0	46.60	10	$10M	2 Gladys	None	There was one subtropical storm with Category 1 hurricane strength.
1969		18	12	3	149.25	364	$1.7bn	5 Camille	5 Camille	Tied for the third most hurricanes in a season on record.
Total		116	64	23	1124.09	9,933	$5.82bn	Camille	11 names	

=== 1970s ===
Year	Map	TS	H	MH	ACE	Deaths	Damage	Strongest storm	Retired names	Notes
1970		14	7	2	66.63	71	$454M	4 Celia	4 Celia	First season of a 24-year period of decreased activity in the Atlantic (-AMO)
1971		14	6	2	96.53	45	$213M	4 Edith	None	Includes first documented hurricane to cross Central America, Irene. Includes one named subtropical storm, Kristy.
1972		12	2	0	35.61	122	$2.1bn	1 Betty	1 Agnes	Includes eight storms that were subtropical at one point.
1973		12	5	1	47.85	15	$18M	3 Ellen	None	
1974		12	4	2	68.13	8,260+	$1.97bn	4 Carmen	4 Carmen; 2 Fifi	Includes three subtropical storms. Fifi was the third-deadliest hurricane on record.
1975		12	7	4	76.06	80	$100M	4 Gladys	3 Eloise	Current extent of the reanalysis project as of September 2026
1976		10	6	2	84.17	72	$100M	3 Belle	None	Includes two subtropical storms.
1977		6	5	1	25.32	10	$10M	5 Anita	5 Anita	Features the strongest Atlantic hurricane to strike Mexico. Least active season to feature a category 5, tied with 1928. One of four seasons to have a category 5 as the sole major hurricane of the season. Highest tropical storm-hurricane ratio in the satellite era
1978		12	5	2	63.22	37	$45M	4 Greta	4 Greta	Includes one off-season subtropical storm.
1979		9	6	2	92.92	2,118	$4.3bn	5 David	5 David; 4 Frederic	First year for alternating male/female names. Includes one subtropical storm of Category 1 strength.
Total		99	51	16	657	10,830+	$9.31bn	David	9 names	

=== 1980s ===
Year	Map	TC	TS	H	MH	ACE	Deaths	Damage	Strongest storm	Retired names	Notes
1980		18	11	9	2	148.94	256	$1bn	5 Allen	5 Allen	Allen had the highest sustained winds on record for an Atlantic hurricane, a record later tied by Melissa in 2025.
1981		22	12	7	3	100.38	10	$45M	4 Harvey	None	
1982		8	6	2	1	31.50	141	$100M	4 Debby	None	
1983		6	4	3	1	17.40	22	$2.6bn	3 Alicia	3 Alicia	Least active hurricane season in the satellite era, in terms of both named storms and ACE. Featured no storms in October.
1984		20	13	5	1	84.30	35	$66M	4 Diana	None	Latest forming A-named storm on record.
1985		14	11	7	3	87.98	241	$4.5bn	4 Gloria	3 Elena; 4 Gloria	Hurricane Kate struck Florida on November 21, the latest United States hurricane landfall.
1986		10	6	4	0	35.79	70	$57M	2 Earl	None	
1987		14	7	3	1	34.36	10	$90M	3 Emily	None	
1988		19	12	5	3	102.99	550	$7bn	5 Gilbert	5 Gilbert; 4 Joan	Gilbert was the most intense Atlantic hurricane on record until 2005. Joan was the first hurricane to cross Central America since 1978.
1989		15	11	7	2	135.13	112	$10.7bn	5 Hugo	5 Hugo	Hugo held the record for costliest U.S. hurricane for 3 years until Andrew.
Total		148	93	52	17	778.71	1,447	$26.2bn	Gilbert	7 names	

=== 1990s ===
Year	Map	TC	TS	H	MH	ACE	Deaths	Damage	Strongest storm	Retired names	Notes
1990		16	14	8	1	96.80	116	$150M	3 Gustav	2 Diana; 1 Klaus	No tropical storms or hurricanes made landfall in the United States.
1991		12	8	4	2	35.54	30	$2.5bn	4 Claudette	3 Bob	Featured the Perfect Storm—a deliberately unnamed hurricane that made landfall in Atlantic Canada.
1992		10	7	4	1	76.22	66	$27bn	5 Andrew	5 Andrew	Hurricane Andrew was the costliest U.S. hurricane until 2005. One of four seasons to have a category 5 as the sole major hurricane of the season.
1993		10	8	4	1	38.67	274	$271M	3 Emily	None	No storms were active in October.
1994		12	7	3	0	32.02	1,184	$1.56bn	2 Florence	None	Last season of a 24-year period of decreased activity in the Atlantic (-AMO).
1995		21	19	11	5	227.10	115	$9.3bn	4 Opal	4 Luis; 3 Marilyn; 4 Opal; 3 Roxanne	Tied for fifth most active season on record (with 1887, 2010, 2011 and 2012). First season of an ongoing period of increased activity in the Atlantic (+AMO).
1996		13	13	9	6	166.18	179	$3.8bn	4 Edouard	1 Cesar; 3 Fran; 4 Hortense	
1997		9	8	3	1	40.93	11	$110M	3 Erika	None	Least active August (0) and September (1) combined, tied with 1914.
1998		14	14	10	3	181.77	12,000+	$12.2bn	5 Mitch	4 Georges; 5 Mitch	Four simultaneous hurricanes on September 26, the first time since 1893. Mitch was the deadliest hurricane in over 200 years.
1999		16	12	8	5	176.53	465	$5.9bn	4 Floyd	4 Floyd; 4 Lenny	Most Category 4 hurricanes on record, later tied by 2005 and 2020.
Total		133	110	64	25	1071.75	14,440	$62.7bn	Mitch	15 names	

== 2000s ==
NOTE: In the following tables, all estimates of damage costs are expressed in contemporaneous US dollars (USD).

=== 2000s ===
Year	Map	TC	TS	H	MH	ACE	Deaths	Damage	Strongest storm	Retired names	Notes
2000		19	15	8	3	119.145	105	$1.3bn	4 Keith	4 Keith	Features Hurricane Alberto—the longest-traveled hurricane in the Atlantic.
2001		17	15	9	4	110.32	153	$11.4bn	4 Michelle	TS Allison; 4 Iris; 4 Michelle	Allison was the first Atlantic system that peaked at tropical storm status to have its name retired.
2002		14	12	4	2	67.99	50	$2.5bn	3 Isidore	3 Isidore; 4 Lili	Gustav became the first subtropical storm to receive a name since 1973, and the first from the modern naming list.
2003		21	16	7	3	176.84	93	$6.3bn	5 Isabel	4 Fabian; 5 Isabel; 2 Juan	Ana became the first named storm to form in April. Includes 3 off-season storms.
2004		16	15	9	6	226.88	3,260	$61.2bn	5 Ivan	4 Charley; 4 Frances; 5 Ivan; 3 Jeanne	Featured Ivan, the southernmost hurricane in the basin (9.5°N). Four hurricanes made landfall in Florida; Charley, Frances, Ivan and Jeanne (all of which were retired).
2005		31	28	15	7	250.13	3,912	$171.8bn	5 Wilma	4 Dennis; 5 Katrina; 5 Rita; 1 Stan; 5 Wilma	Second-costliest hurricane season on record. Second most active on record, most active in terms of hurricanes, major hurricanes (tied with 2020), and Category 5 hurricanes. Most retired names. The first year to use the Greek alphabet, later also used in 2020. Includes 1 subtropical storm and 1 subtropical depression.
2006		10	10	5	2	78.54	14	$504.4M	3 Gordon; 3 Helene	None	No storms formed in October.
2007		17	15	6	2	73.89	478	$3.4bn	5 Dean	5 Dean; 5 Felix; 1 Noel	First season on record with two hurricanes landfalling at Category 5 intensity (Dean and Felix).
2008		17	16	8	5	145.72	1,073	$49.4bn	4 Ike	4 Gustav; 4 Ike; 4 Paloma	Only year on record in which a major hurricane existed in every month from July through November.
2009		11	9	3	2	52.58	9	$58M	4 Bill	None	Second-lowest number of hurricanes in the satellite era.
Total		173	151	74	36	1302.02	9,146	$307.9bn	Wilma	24 names	

=== 2010s ===
Year	Map	TC	TS	H	MH	ACE	Deaths	Damage	Strongest storm	Retired names	Notes
2010		21	19	12	5	165.48	393	$7.4bn	4 Igor	4 Igor; 2 Tomas	Fifth most active season on record (tied with 1887, 1995, 2011 and 2012).
2011		20	19	7	4	126.30	112	$17.4bn	4 Ophelia	3 Irene	Fifth most active season on record (tied with 1887, 1995, 2010 and 2012).
2012		19	19	10	2	132.63	355	$72.3bn	3 Sandy	3 Sandy	Fifth most active season on record (tied with 1887, 1995, 2010 and 2011).
2013		15	14	2	0	36.12	54	$1.5bn	1 Humberto	1 Ingrid	Featured one unnamed subtropical storm in December, the most recent post-season tropical cyclone as of 2025. First season since 1994 with no major hurricanes. Most recent season to feature no major hurricanes.
2014		9	8	6	2	66.73	21	$371.6M	4 Gonzalo	None	Featured the fewest tropical storms since 1997. Most recent to feature no storms before July.
2015		12	11	4	2	62.69	89	$813.9M	4 Joaquin	TS Erika; 4 Joaquin	Erika was the second Atlantic tropical storm to have its name retired, following Tropical Storm Allison in 2001. Most recent to feature below-average activity
2016		16	15	7	4	141.25	736	≥$17.5bn	5 Matthew	5 Matthew; 3 Otto	Alex became the first satellite-era January hurricane on record.
2017		18	17	10	6	224.87	3,364	≥$294.7bn	5 Maria	4 Harvey; 5 Irma; 5 Maria; 1 Nate	Features Arlene, a rare April storm. Costliest tropical cyclone season on record.
2018		16	15	8	2	132.58	172	≥$50.5bn	5 Michael	4 Florence; 5 Michael	Includes seven storms that were subtropical at one point.
2019		20	18	6	3	132.20	118	$11.6bn	5 Dorian	5 Dorian	Includes two subtropical storms.
Total		166	155	72	30	1220.86	5,413	$474.1bn	Maria	16 names	

=== 2020s ===
Year	Map	TC	TS	H	MH	ACE	Deaths	Damage	Strongest storm	Retired names	Notes
2020		31	30	14	7	180.37	432	>$54.3bn	4 Iota	4 Laura; 4 Eta; 4 Iota	Most active season in terms of tropical depressions and named storms, and second most active in terms of hurricanes. Tied with 2005 for most recorded major hurricanes. Second and final season after 2005 to use the Greek alphabet.
2021		21	21	7	4	145.55	198	$80.8bn	4 Sam	4 Ida	Third most active season on record.
2022		16	14	8	2	94.6	305	>$118bn	4 Fiona	4 Fiona; 5 Ian	First season not to have above-average activity since 2015 and first with near normal activity since 2007. First season since 1996 to have more than one Atlantic–Pacific crossover hurricane (Bonnie and Julia). First season since 1997 without a storm active in August, first of such during a La Niña year. First season since 2013 without any hurricanes before September.
2023		21	20	7	3	148.2	19	>$4.2bn	5 Lee	None	Fourth most active season on record (tied with 1933), most active during an El Niño year. Featured one unnamed subtropical storm in January.
2024		18	18	11	5	161.5	442	$131bn	5 Milton	5 Beryl; 4 Helene; 5 Milton	Featured Beryl, the earliest forming Category 5 hurricane on record in the Atlantic basin. Featured Milton, tied with Rita of 2005 for the most intense hurricane on record in the Gulf of Mexico. Featured Oscar, the smallest hurricane recorded in the Atlantic basin.
2025		13	13	5	4	130.8	126	>$12.7bn	5 Melissa	5 Melissa	Second season on record to feature more than two Category 5 hurricanes. First season since 2015 where no hurricanes made landfall in the United States.
2026		10	10	1	1	19.9	13	>$3.8bn	3 Isaias	TBD	Isaias became the latest first hurricane in the satellite era, surpassing 2002 and 2013, and latest overall since 1905.
Total		130	126	53	26	880.52	≥1,535	>$404.8bn	Melissa	10 names	
