= 1865 Atlantic hurricane season =

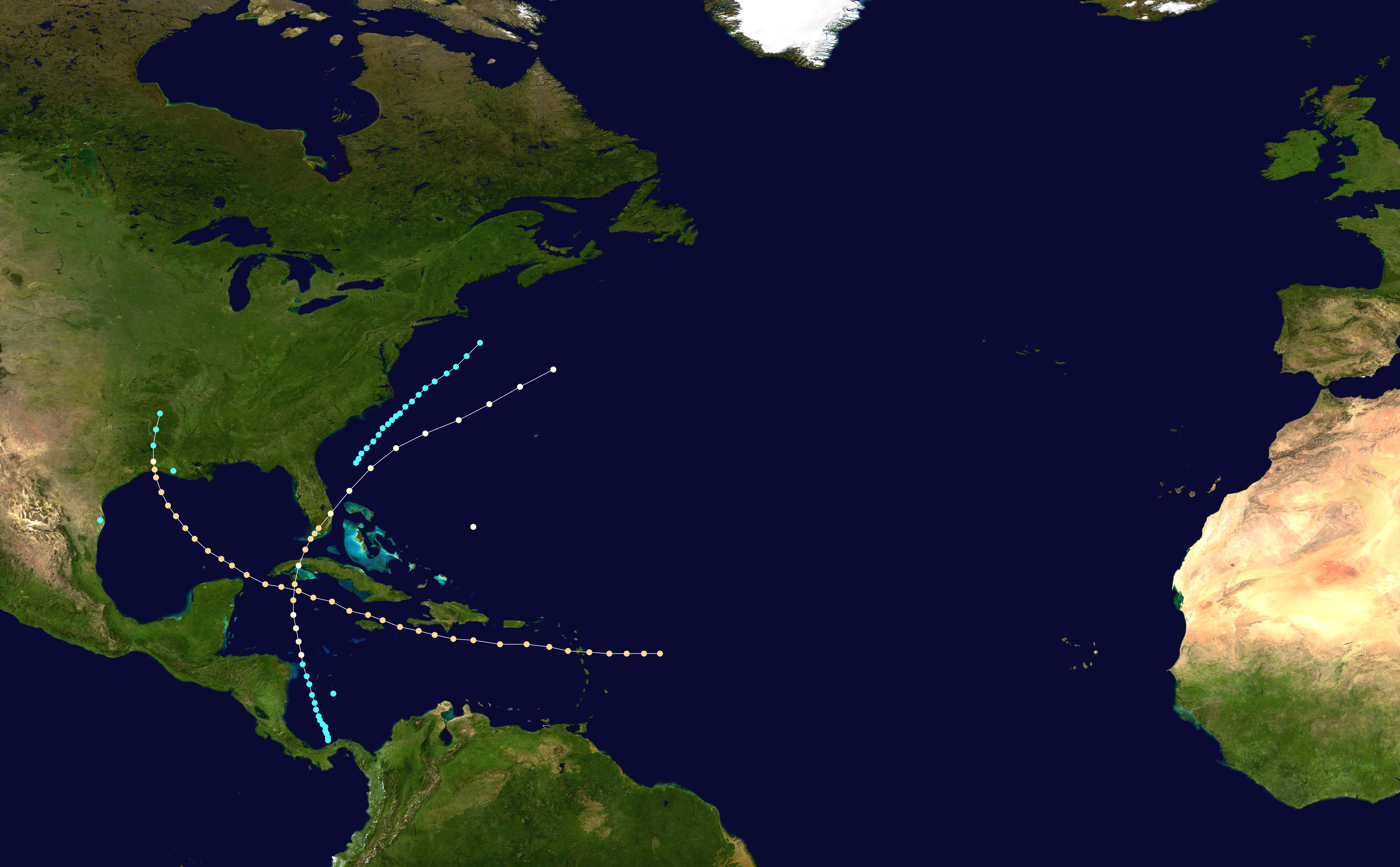
- Season summary map

Seasonal boundaries
- First system formed: May 30, 1865
- Last system dissipated: October 25, 1865

Strongest storm
- Name: Four and Seven
  - Maximum winds: 105 mph (165 km/h) (1-minute sustained)
  - Lowest pressure: 969 mbar (hPa; 28.61 inHg)

Seasonal statistics
- Total depressions: 7
- Total storms: 7
- Hurricanes: 3
- Major hurricanes (Cat. 3+): 0
- Total fatalities: 326
- Total damage: Unknown

The 1865 Atlantic hurricane season was an Atlantic hurricane season in the year 1865. It included two landfalling hurricanes, with one that caused over 325 deaths. The first storm was reported on May 30 by ships in the western Caribbean. A month later, a storm hit southern Texas, and in late August, a storm paralleled the coastline of the Carolinas. The fourth storm of the season was also the longest-lasting, forming east of the Lesser Antilles before hitting Guadeloupe and eventually moving ashore in Louisiana. In both of its major landfalls, the storm left many houses destroyed. There was confusion whether or not the fifth storm of the season was separate from the fourth storm, as both systems struck Louisiana in September. Another hurricane occurred in late September, before the final storm of the season developed north of Panama. The final hurricane struck Cuba and Key West, Florida before dissipating north of Bermuda on October 25.

At one time, one hurricane researcher identified a tropical storm over Cuba in late August, although there was no evidence the storm actually existed. There was also a report of a hurricane over Louisiana on October 22, although it is unknown if it was related to other storms in the season. There may have been additional unconfirmed tropical cyclones during the season. Meteorologist Christopher Landsea estimates up to six storms were missed from the official database, due to small tropical cyclone size, sparse ship reports, and relatively unpopulated coastlines.

== Systems ==
=== Tropical Storm One ===
- Tropical storm (SSHWS)
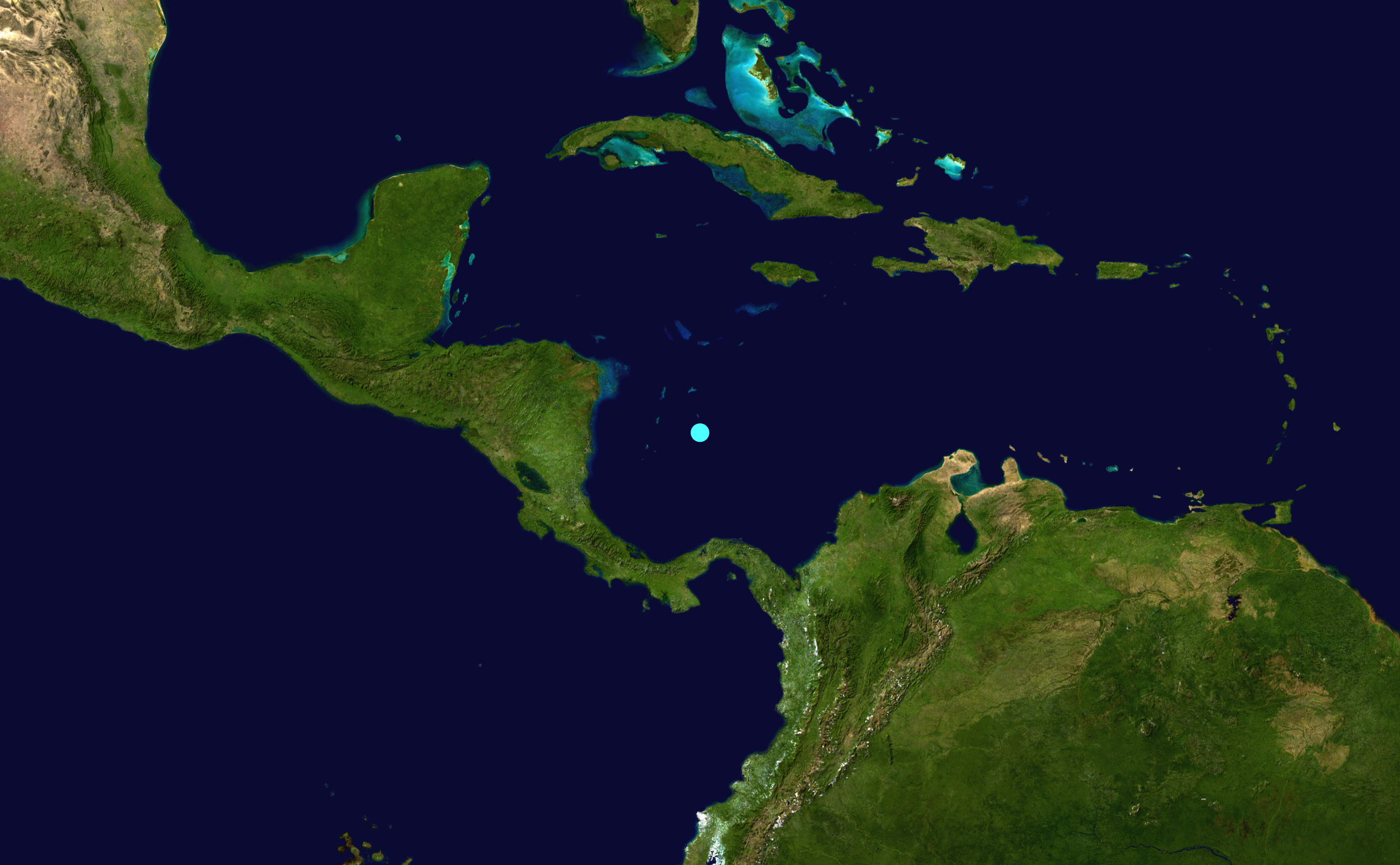
- Duration: May 30 – May 30
- Peak intensity: 60 mph (95 km/h) (1-min);

On May 30, a tropical storm in the western Caribbean Sea wrecked a ship named the "Golden Rule", which was sailing from New York to the east coast of Nicaragua. The ship first encountered the storm on May 29, reporting high winds and heavy rainfall. After the wreck, the crew sailed to a nearby island, where they were rescued by two United States ships after 10 days. The winds were estimated at 60 mph (97 km/h), although the entire track of the storm is unknown, HURDAT has done its best to track it. Climate researcher Michael Chenoweth proposed the removal of this storm from HURDAT in a 2014 study, noting "Insufficient supporting evidence from other neighboring data sources".

=== Tropical Storm Two ===
- Tropical storm (SSHWS)
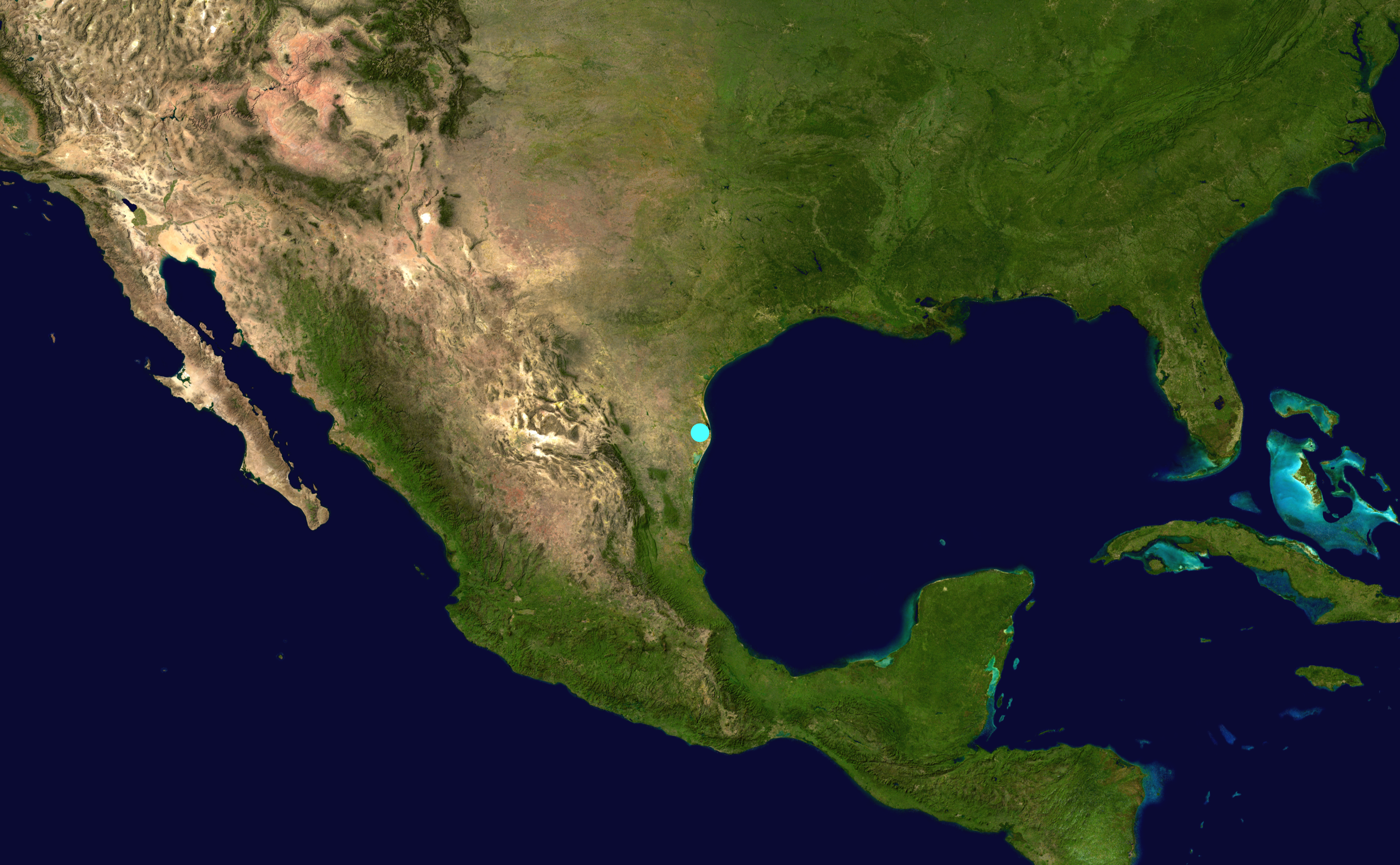
- Duration: June 30 – June 30
- Peak intensity: 60 mph (95 km/h) (1-min);

The second known storm of the season was reported near Brownsville, Texas on June 30. Its existence is known based on a newspaper report in the New Orleans Times. The winds were estimated at 60 mph (97 km/h); however, it is a potentially unreliable estimate due to a lack of significant population providing observations. The entire track of the storm is unknown. It is possible that a Tropical Depression reported by newspapers 1 day later was the same as this one, except at a lower intensity and wind speed. Chenoweth argues that severe weather reported due to this storm was a localized event, not a tropical cyclone.

=== Tropical Storm Three ===
- Tropical storm (SSHWS)
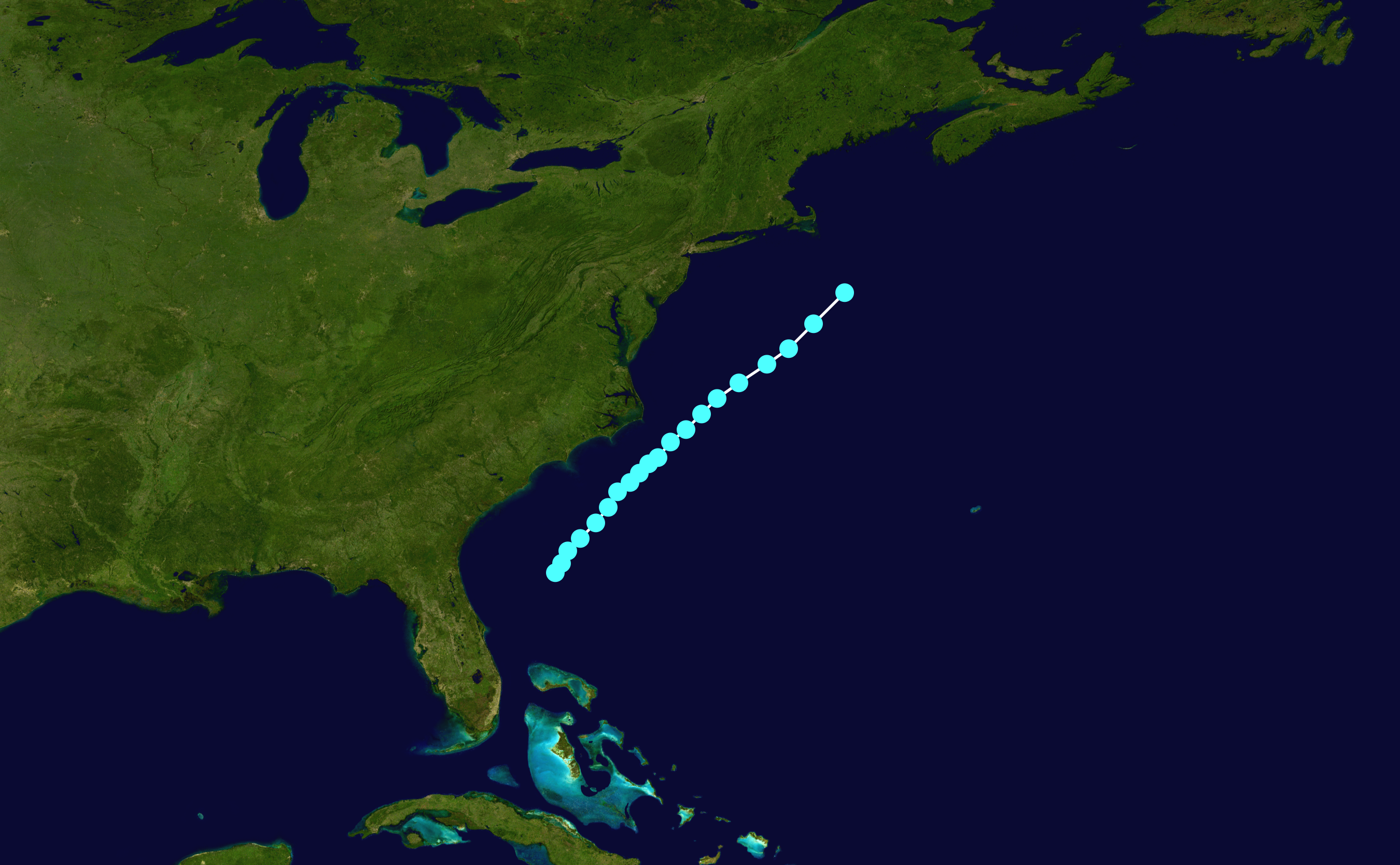
- Duration: August 20 – August 24
- Peak intensity: 70 mph (110 km/h) (1-min);

A ship off the coast of Hatteras, North Carolina sustained damage from a storm on August 20. Further ship reports indicated the tropical storm maintained a general northeast track off the North Carolina coastline. On August 22 the storm made its closest approach to the state, and while remaining offshore it produced winds of around 45 mph (72 km/h) along the coast. Around that time, the storm attained peak winds of 70 mph (110 km/h) over the ocean. On August 23, high waves from the storm left one ship's cargo extremely damaged. It was last observed on August 24 to the southeast of Nantucket. Chenoweth proposed the removal of this storm, noting that evidence instead supports a cold front due to a break in heat wave.

=== Hurricane Four ===
- Category 2 hurricane (SSHWS)
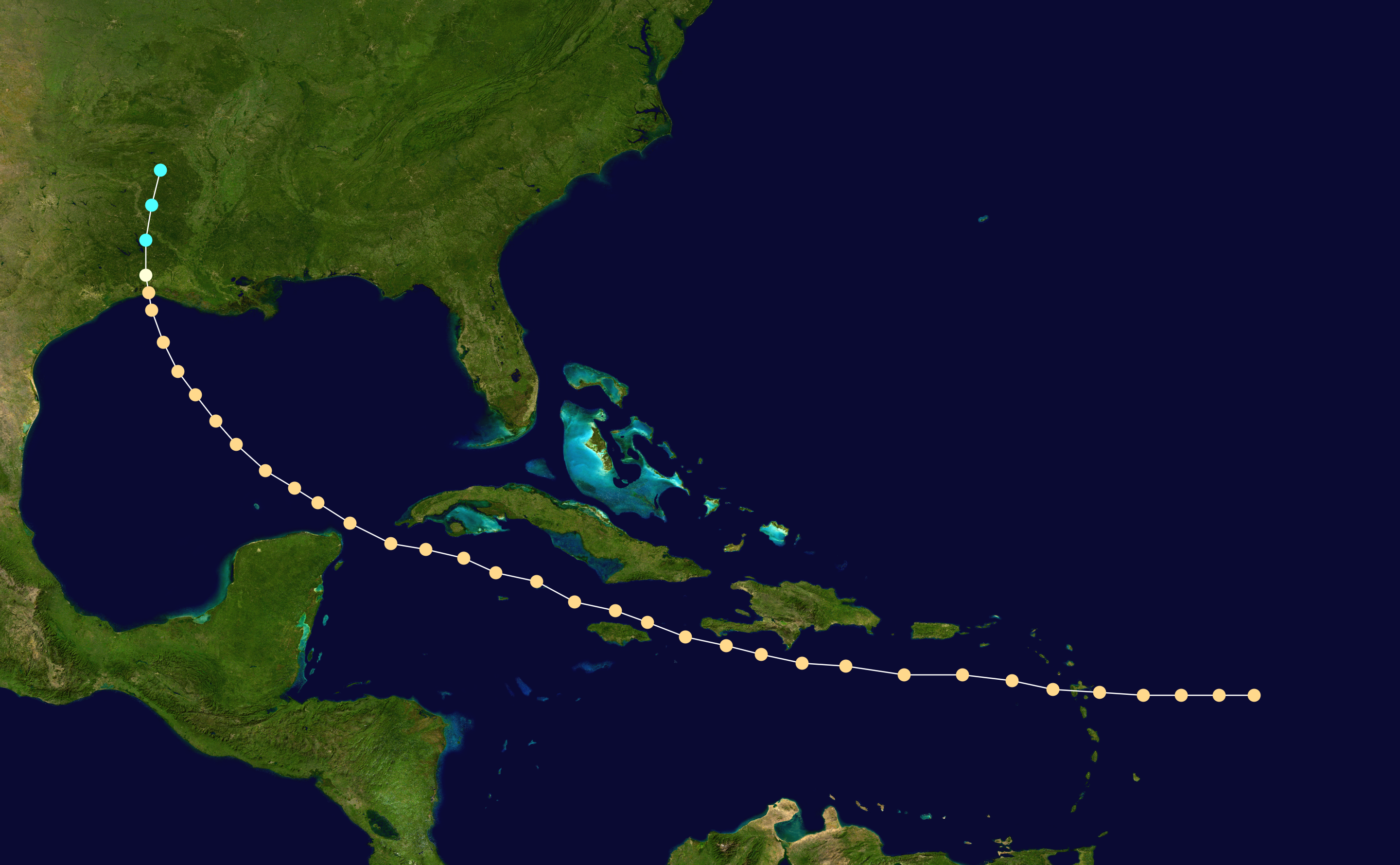
- Duration: September 6 – September 14
- Peak intensity: 105 mph (165 km/h) (1-min); 969 mbar (hPa)

The Sabine River-Lake Calcasieu Hurricane of 1865

The fourth tropical cyclone of the season, also the longest-lasting, was first observed on September 6 to the east of the Lesser Antilles. A small cyclone, it tracked westward and struck Guadeloupe as a fully developed hurricane. Many residents in the small nearby island of Marie-Galante evacuated to Guadeloupe, but some died in the attempt. In Îles des Saintes, the hurricane destroyed all but two buildings. Damage was similarly heavy in Basse-Terre. The overall death toll was estimated at 300, including 36 on Marie-Galante. After moving through the Lesser Antilles, the hurricane moved through the Caribbean Sea, passing between Jamaica and Haiti and bypassing Cuba to the south. It curved northward in the Gulf of Mexico, moving ashore on September 13 near the border between Texas and Louisiana with an estimated atmospheric pressure of 969 millibars (28.6 inHg).

Upon moving ashore, the hurricane produced high tides as far east as the mouth of the Mississippi River, in addition to as far inland as Calcasieu Lake, Louisiana. Three towns were destroyed, causing two of them to be abandoned. Across the state, there were 25 deaths, many of them in Leesburg. In neighboring Texas, damage was greatest in Orange, where 196 homes were destroyed out of the 200 in the town. The hurricane capsized 19 boats in the Sabine River, causing multiple deaths. The hurricane weakened over Louisiana and dissipated over Arkansas on September 14. It was also known as the "Sabine River-Lake Calcasieu Storm".

=== Tropical Storm Five ===
- Tropical storm (SSHWS)
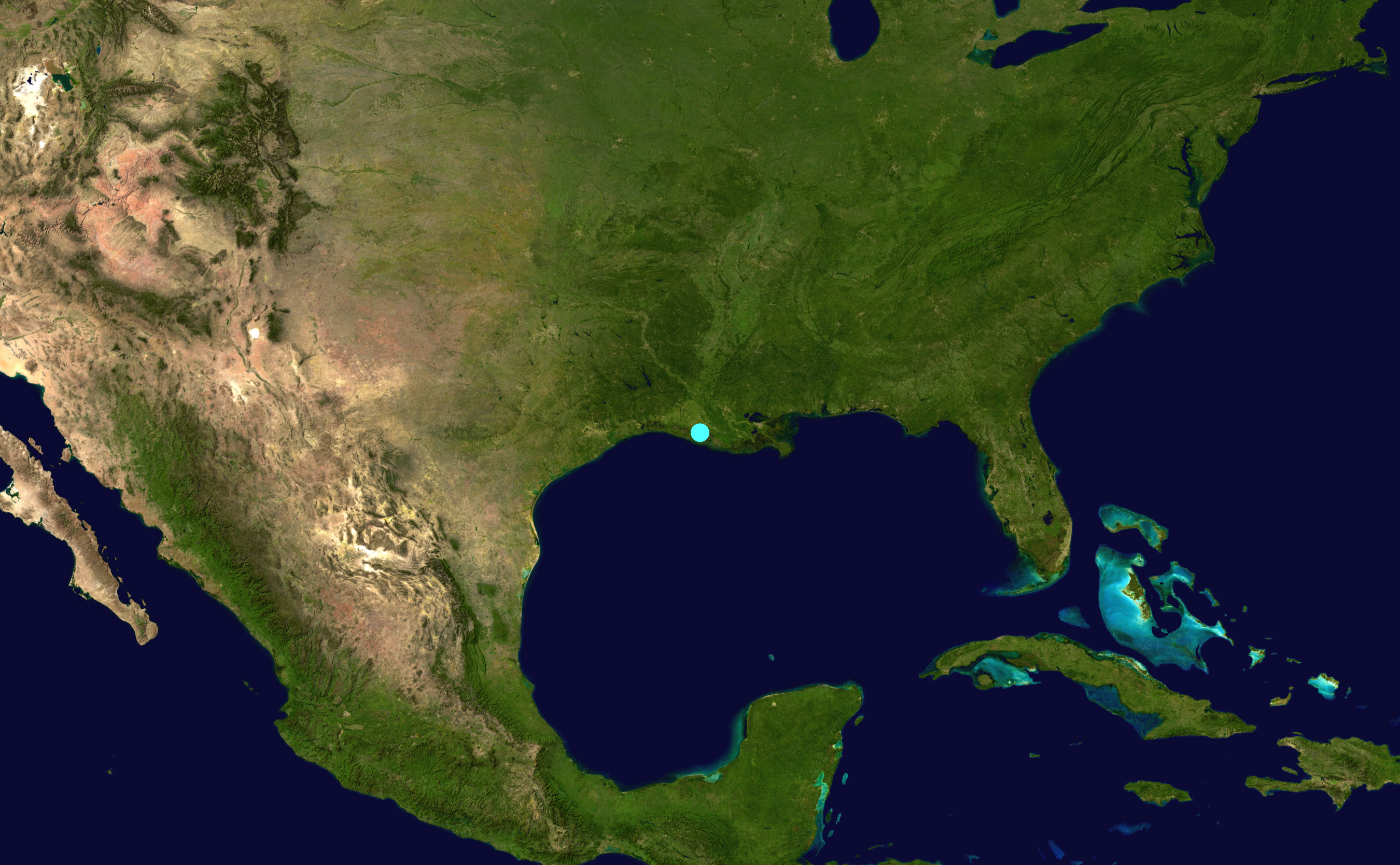
- Duration: September 7 – September 7
- Peak intensity: 70 mph (110 km/h) (1-min);

A tropical storm struck the south-central Louisiana coast on September 7, while the previous system was located over the Caribbean. The storm wrecked a ship, and its winds were estimated around 70 mph (110 km/h). The track was incomplete, and there was a possibility that the storm was misreported as the previous hurricane. Chenoweth also argued for the removal of this storm from HURDAT, noting that evidence does not support a tropical system and that information obtained have may have been associated with the previous cyclone.

=== Hurricane Six ===
- Category 1 hurricane (SSHWS)
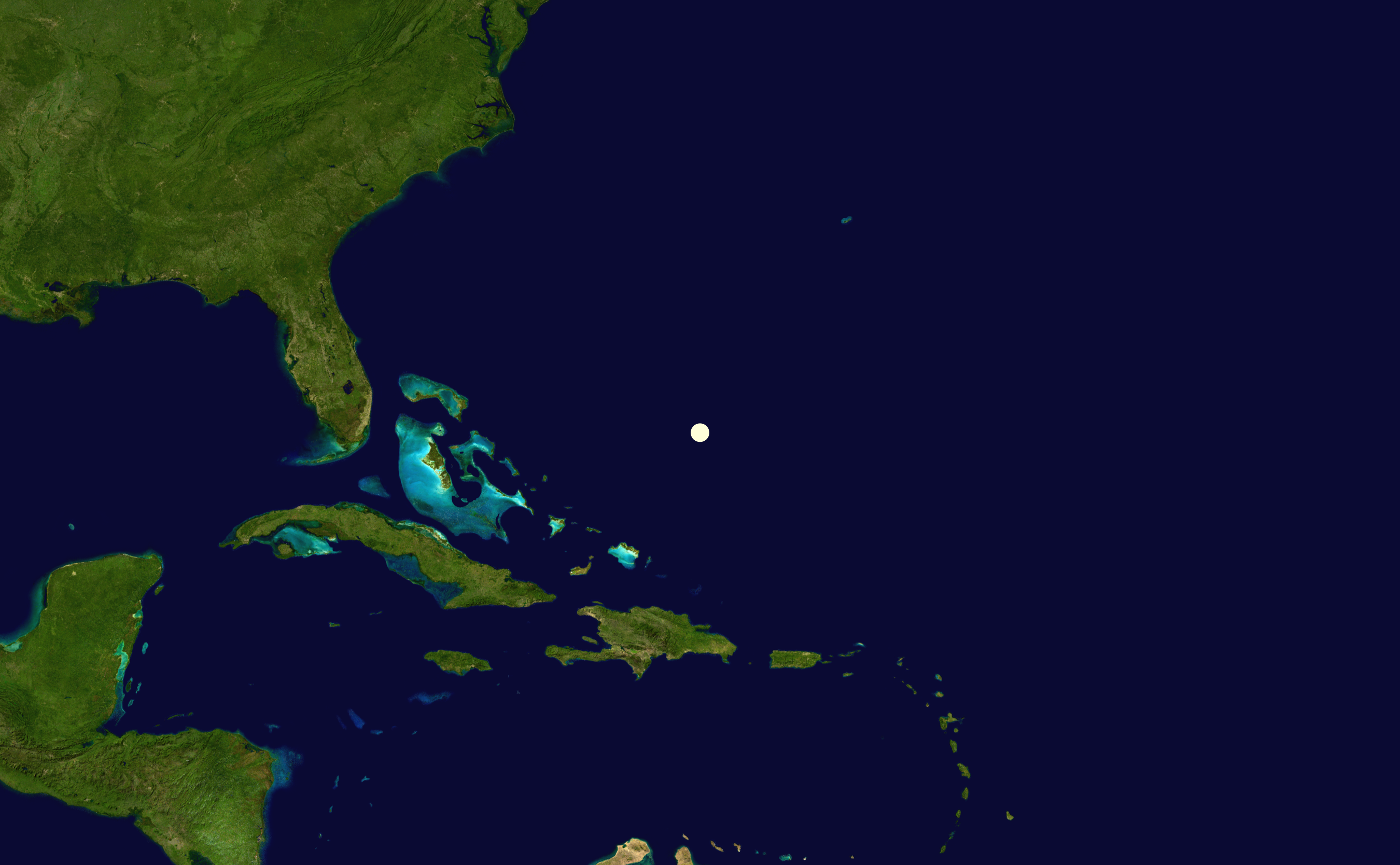
- Duration: September 28 – September 28
- Peak intensity: 80 mph (130 km/h) (1-min);

On September 28, a ship encountered a hurricane to the northeast of the Turks and Caicos islands. The winds in the hurricane extended far to the northwest, and high waves affected the southeast United States coast from Charleston, South Carolina to Cape Hatteras. The hurricane's track is unknown.

=== Hurricane Seven ===
- Category 2 hurricane (SSHWS)
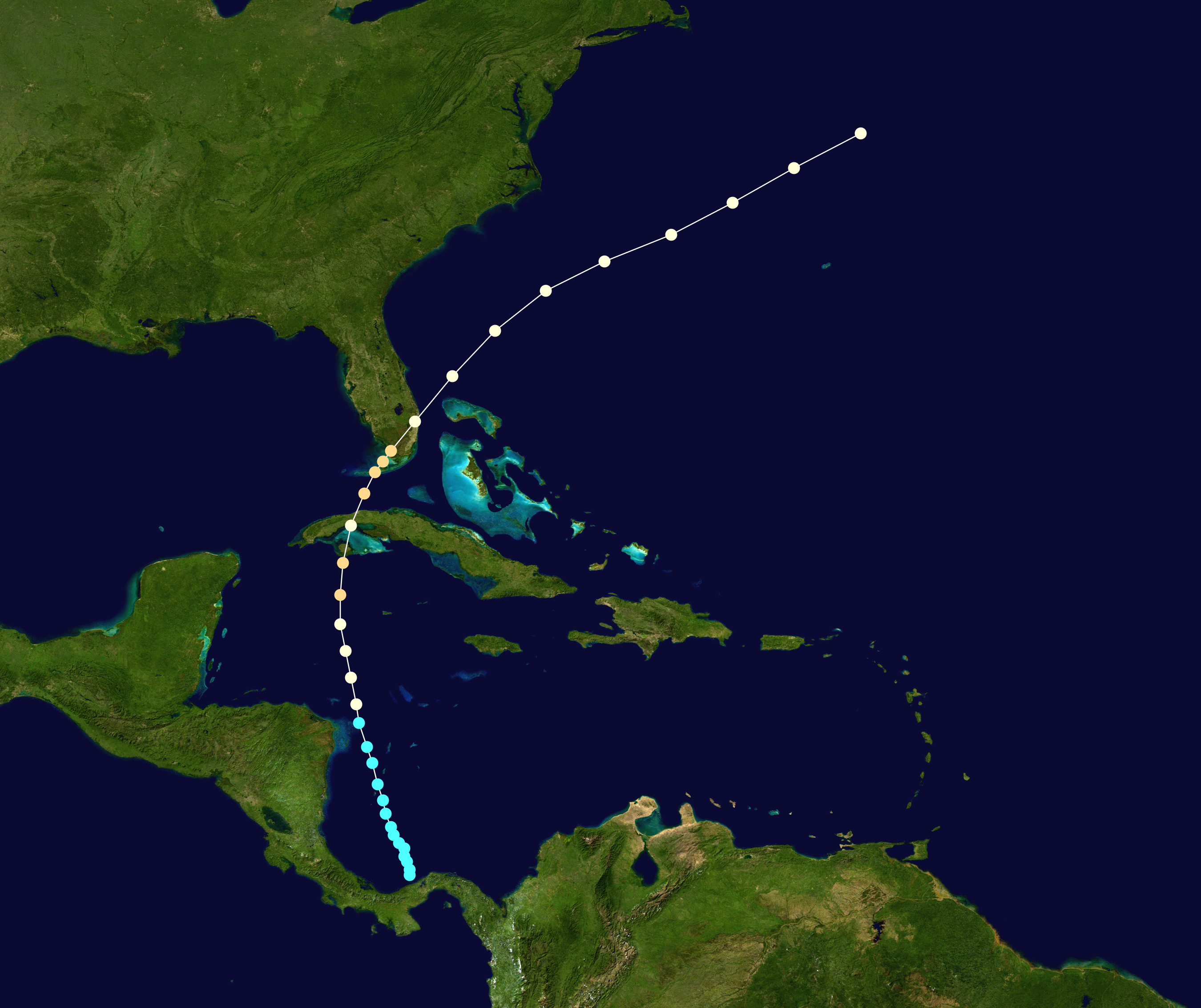
- Duration: October 18 – October 25
- Peak intensity: 105 mph (165 km/h) (1-min); 969 mbar (hPa)

The final tropical cyclone of the season formed on October 18, just north of the coast of Panama. The storm brushed the country's coast with high waves for several days, causing $300,000 in damage (1865 USD). Moving north-northwestward, the storm intensified into a hurricane by October 21 over the western Caribbean. After turning more to the north, it struck Cuba, producing strong winds that destroyed the roof of the Belen College Observatory in Havana. In the city, the hurricane destroyed several boats and houses. A station on the island recorded a pressure of 975 mbar (28.8 inHg), suggesting winds of about 80 mph (130 km/h).

After crossing the island, the hurricane intensified further over the Florida straits until striking Key West, Florida, where peak winds were estimated around 105 mph (169 km/h). Its pressure was estimated at 969 millibars (28.6 inHg), and the hurricane either sunk or washed every boat ashore at the harbor in Key West. Rainfall totaled 4.10 in (104 mm) over a three-day period. In nearby Fort Jefferson in the Dry Tortugas, the hurricane destroyed one building and damaged several others, killing one person. It later moved across the Florida mainland, weakening slightly. It is possible that this hurricane crossed over from the Pacific, however Pacific records are not reliable from this time. About a dozen ships encountered the hurricane across the western Atlantic, before the storm was last observed on October 25 north of Bermuda.

== See also ==
- Atlantic hurricane
- Atlantic hurricane reanalysis project
- Tropical cyclone observation
