= 1859 Atlantic hurricane season =

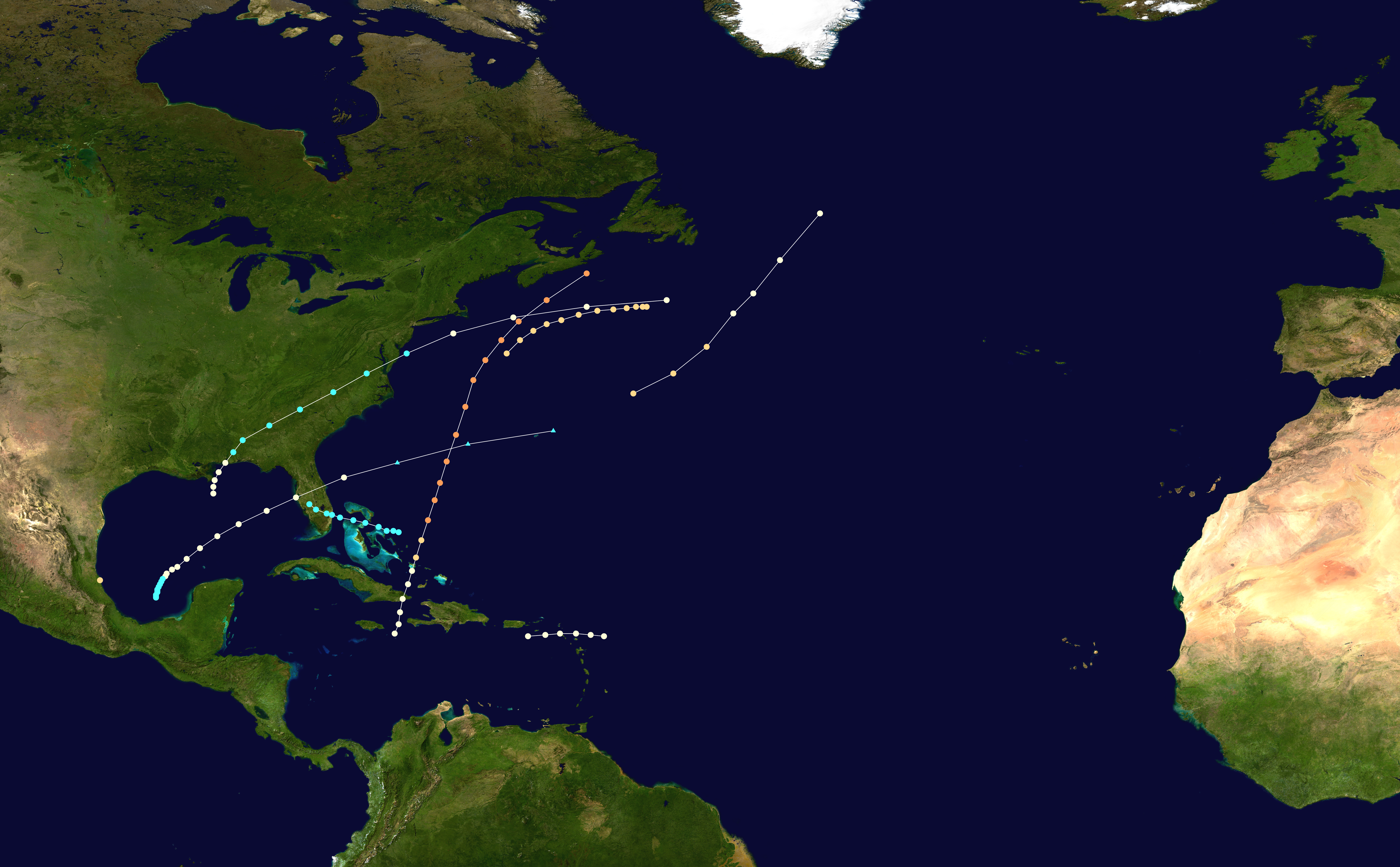
- Season summary map

Seasonal boundaries
- First system formed: July 1, 1859
- Last system dissipated: October 29, 1859

Strongest storm
- Name: Six
  - Maximum winds: 125 mph (205 km/h) (1-minute sustained)
  - Lowest pressure: 938 mbar (hPa; 27.7 inHg)

Seasonal statistics
- Total depressions: 8
- Total storms: 8
- Hurricanes: 7
- Major hurricanes (Cat. 3+): 1
- Total fatalities: Numerous at sea
- Total damage: Unknown

The 1859 Atlantic hurricane season featured seven hurricanes, the most recorded during an Atlantic hurricane season until 1870. However, in the absence of modern satellite and other remote-sensing technologies, only storms that affected populated land areas or encountered ships at sea were recorded, so the actual total could be higher. An undercount bias of zero to six tropical cyclones per year between 1851 and 1885 has been estimated. Of the eight known 1859 cyclones, five were first documented in 1995 by Jose Fernandez-Partagás and Henry Diaz, which was largely adopted by the National Oceanic and Atmospheric Administration's Atlantic hurricane reanalysis in their updates to the Atlantic hurricane database (HURDAT), with some adjustments. HURDAT is the official source for hurricane data such as track and intensity, although due to sparse records, listings on some storms are incomplete.

The first tropical cyclone was a hurricane observed in the Tuxpan area of Veracruz, Mexico, on July 1. Hurricane conditions were observed along the coast and several vessels were lost. On September 2, another hurricane struck Saint Kitts and Saint Croix, damaging ships on the former. The fifth storm of the season, possibly the most devastating of the season, brought storm surge and hurricane-force winds to the Florida Panhandle and Mobile, Alabama, as well as flooding and wind damage to some areas of the Mid-Atlantic. In early October, the sixth cyclone brought damage to Inagua in the Bahamas. At least 25 boats sunk, with several people drowning after one vessel capsized. Two ships capsized in the Bahamas due to the seventh storm. A ship in the Gulf of Mexico capsized during the eighth and final cyclone, drowning an unknown number of people. The storm became extratropical offshore the Southeastern United States on October 29.

The season's activity was reflected with an accumulated cyclone energy (ACE) rating of 56. ACE is, broadly speaking, a measure of the power of the hurricane multiplied by the length of time it existed, so storms that last a long time, as well as particularly strong hurricanes, have high ACEs. It is only calculated for full advisories on tropical systems at or exceeding 39 mph (63 km/h), which is tropical storm strength.

== Systems ==
=== Hurricane One ===
- Category 2 hurricane (SSHWS)
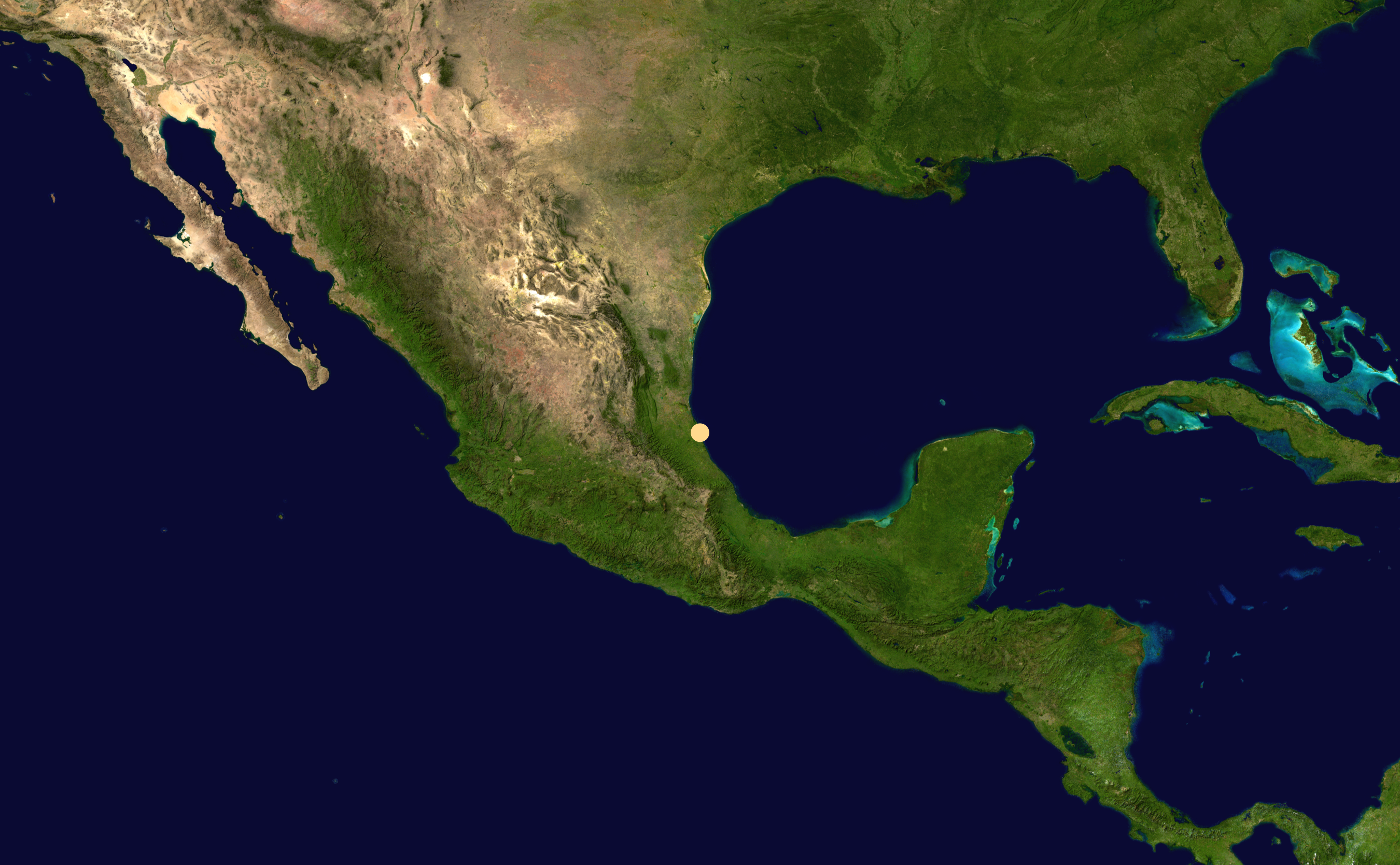
- Duration: July 1 – July 1
- Peak intensity: 105 mph (165 km/h) (1-min);

Little is known about the first observed tropical cyclone of the 1859 season, which was first analyzed in 1995. During late June or early July, cities along the coastal Mexican state of Veracruz experienced a formidable hurricane, and several ships in the Gulf of Mexico were lost. Due to a lack of reports, the storm's listing in the Atlantic hurricane database is limited to a single point near Tuxpan, Veracruz, on July 1, although this date was chiefly chosen as a placeholder in lieu of definitive data. It is estimated that sustained winds reached 105 mph (165 km/h), which is equivalent to a Category 2 hurricane on the modern day Saffir–Simpson hurricane wind scale.

=== Hurricane Two ===
- Category 2 hurricane (SSHWS)
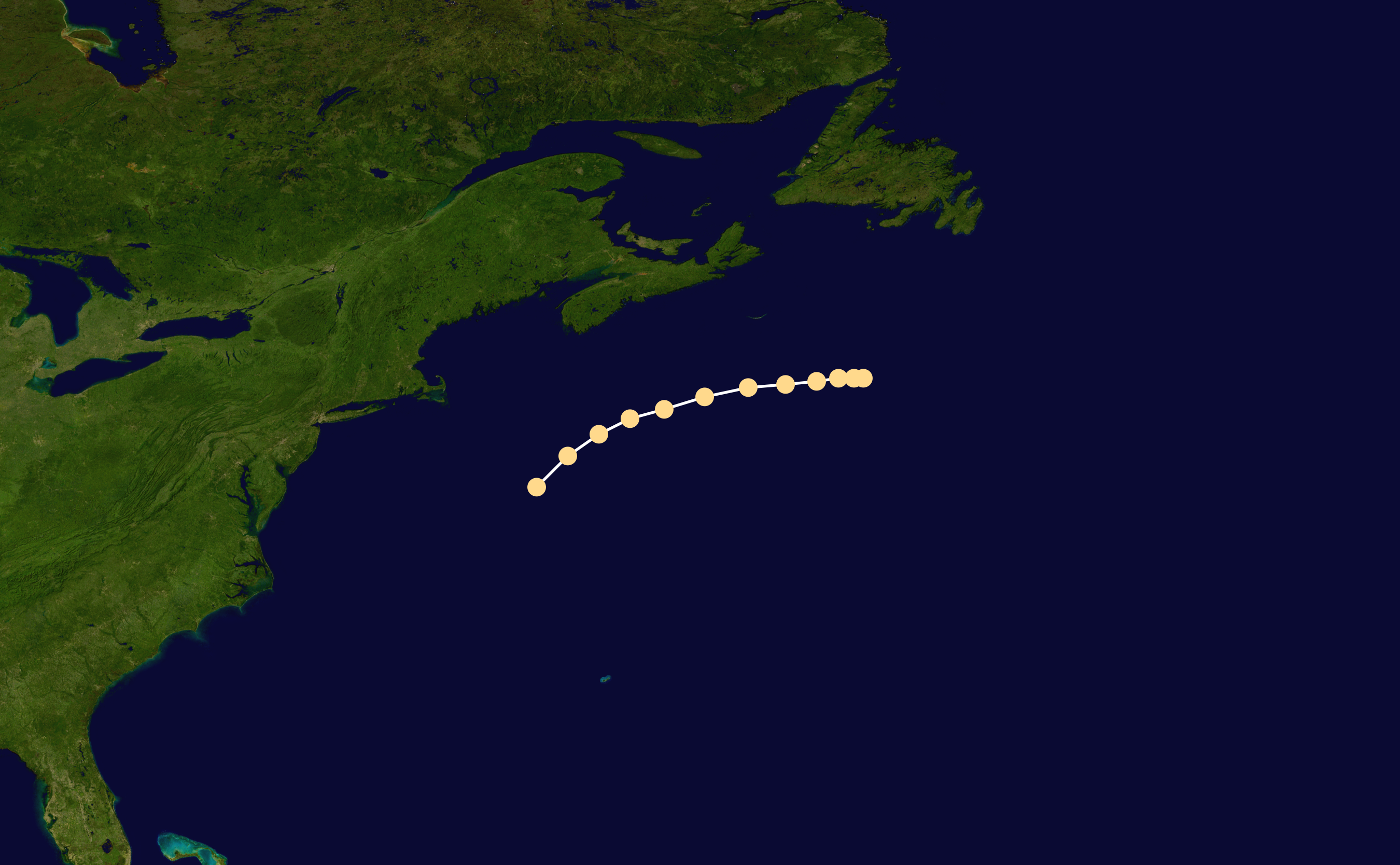
- Duration: August 17 – August 19
- Peak intensity: 105 mph (165 km/h) (1-min); 982 mbar (hPa)

The second known storm of the season was discovered in contemporary reanalysis. It existed in the northwestern Atlantic in the middle of August with the only evidence of the storm being reports from two vessels in the vicinity of bad weather. One vessel, the Tornado, encountered severe winds, starting on August 17, which forced her to abandon her easterly course and sail into New York City. The Caure also experienced strong winds on August 18 and August 19 with a barometric pressure as low as 982 mbar (29.0 inHg). A standard wind–pressure relationship model for that value yields winds of 80 mph (130 km/h). The wind patterns reported by each ship indicate that neither vessel reached the storm's core, where winds are typically at their strongest. As a result, the system is estimated to have attained at least Category 2 intensity. Its approximate track follows an east-northeasterly trajectory.

=== Hurricane Three ===
- Category 1 hurricane (SSHWS)
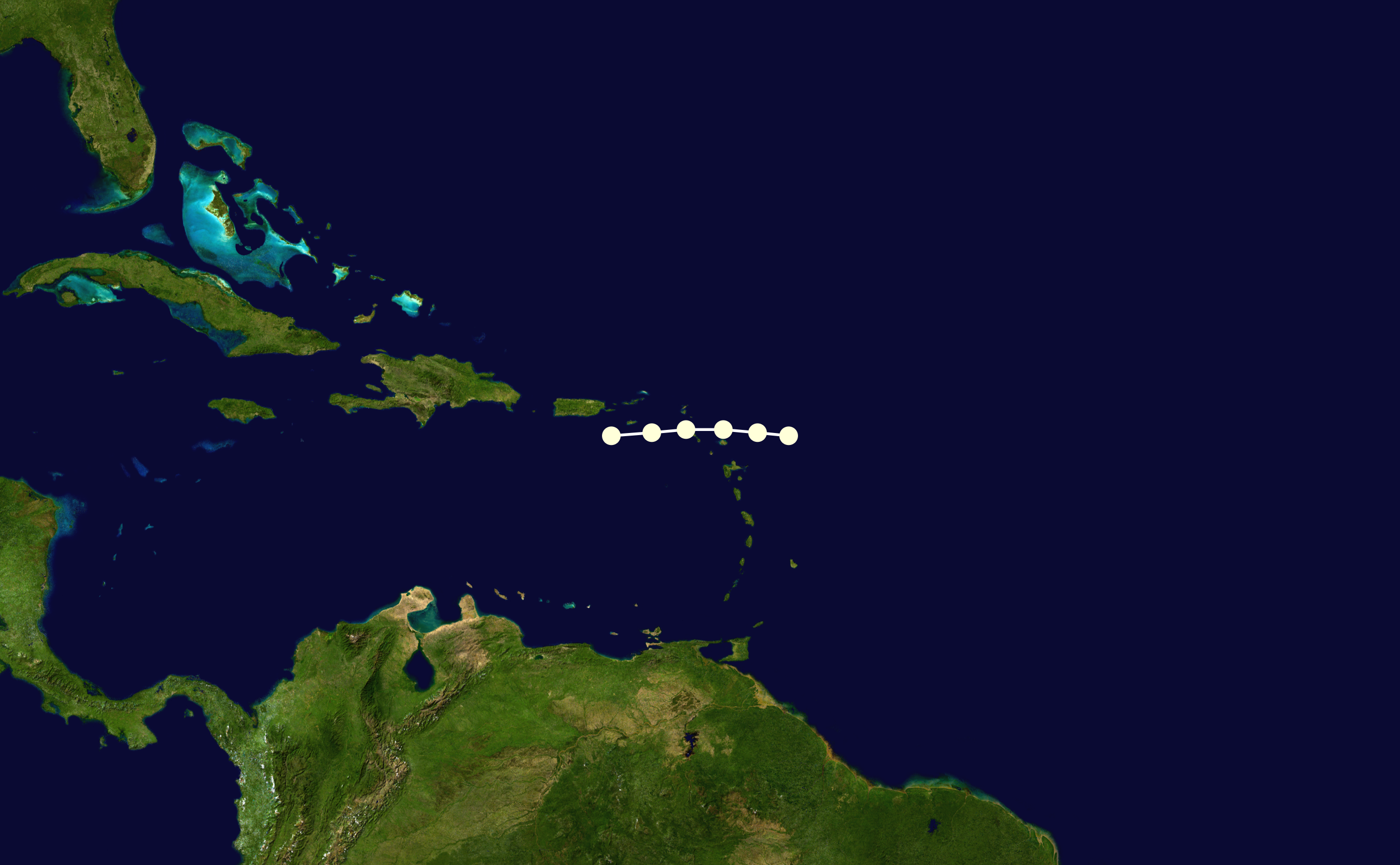
- Duration: September 2 – September 3
- Peak intensity: 80 mph (130 km/h) (1-min);

The first of three hurricanes in September was also the first of the season to be identified prior to 1995. It was described by W. H. Alexander in a 1902 publication as a "mild" system which passed over St. Kitts and later St. Croix on September 2. A short track formulated for the storm in 1995 indicated a path across the northern Lesser Antilles on September 2; the track was shifted slightly toward the south for its inclusion within HURDAT. The highest sustained winds are estimated to have been 80 mph (130 km/h). Climate researcher Michael Chenoweth proposed the removal of this storm from HURDAT, noting "No evidence in newspapers and logbook in the northern Lesser Antilles".

=== Hurricane Four ===
- Category 1 hurricane (SSHWS)
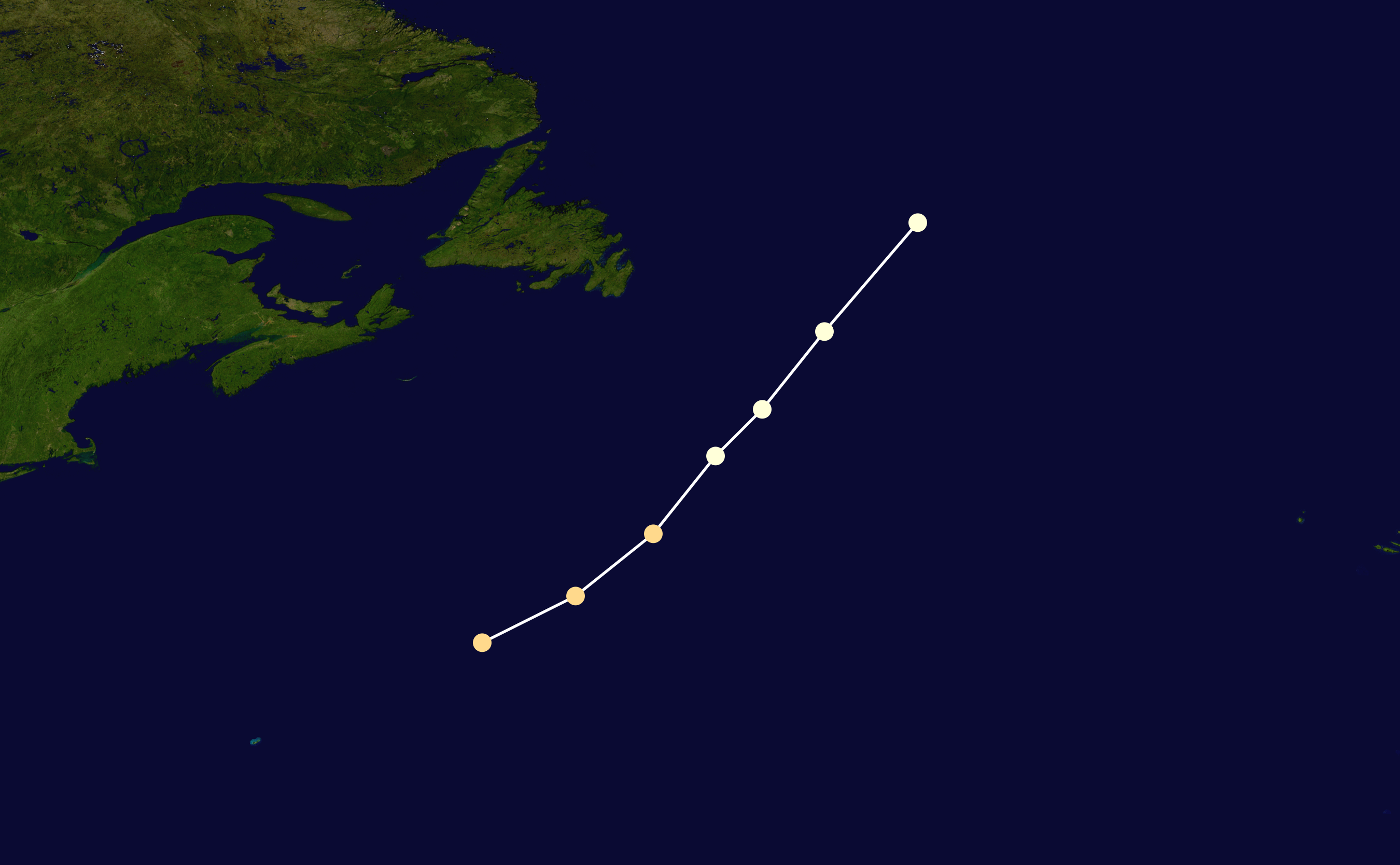
- Duration: September 12 – September 13
- Peak intensity: 80 mph (130 km/h) (1-min);

Based on reports of strong winds from a ship near 40°N, 50°W, Partagás documented another new storm near that point on September 12. As with the previous hurricane, no track existed for this storm until the 1995 HURDAT, when more extensive observations from several additional vessels were utilized. At least four ships sustained structural damage or took on water, and the Bell Flower lost her captain and a crew member to the sea. The severity of the weather encountered by the ships suggested a cyclone of modest hurricane intensity.

=== Hurricane Five ===
- Category 1 hurricane (SSHWS)
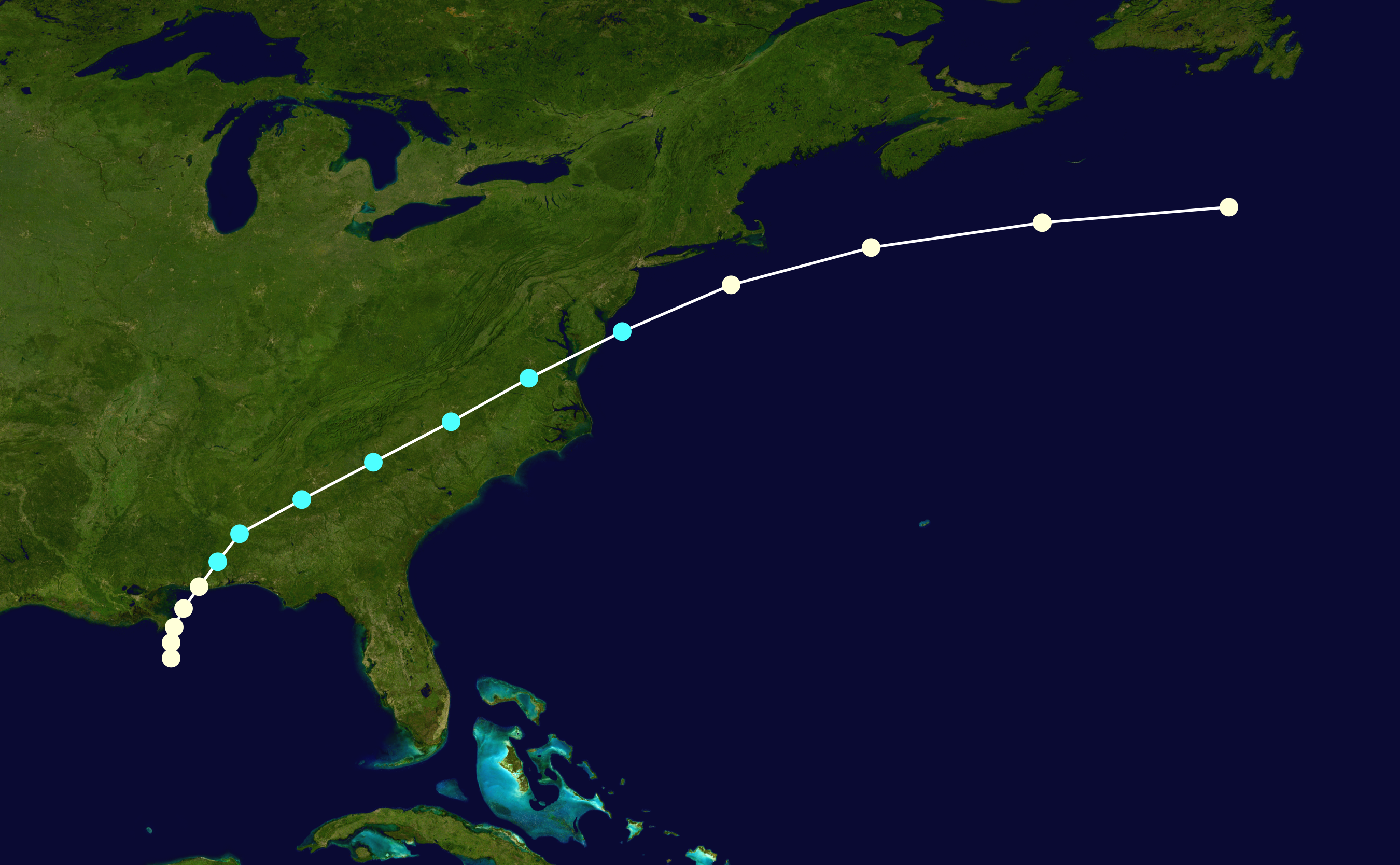
- Duration: September 15 – September 18
- Peak intensity: 80 mph (130 km/h) (1-min); 982 mbar (hPa)

The fifth storm was first mentioned by David M. Ludlum in 1963 as having affected Mobile, Alabama, on September 15, but with no description of its genesis or impacts. Partagás also acknowledged the storm without attempting to reconstruct its track. As a result, the cyclone was initially added to the hurricane database with only a single data point, placing it near Mobile as a Category 1 hurricane. However, in 2003, the reanalysis project expanded the track from September 15 through September 18, using newspaper accounts and reports from both land and sea. With winds of minimal hurricane strength, the storm moved north-northeastward toward the central Gulf Coast. The cyclone made landfall early on September 16 over Alabama with winds estimated at 80 mph (130 km/h) and a barometric pressure of 982 mbar (29.0 inHg). It likely weakened into a tropical storm as it pushed inland, and traversed the Southeastern United States and Mid-Atlantic region. The storm re-emerged into the Atlantic as it continued towards the northeast, and based on ship reports, it is believed to have reattained hurricane intensity prior to passing south of New England and the Canadian Maritimes, before being last noted on September 18.

Hurricane-force winds were reported in the Florida Panhandle. In Alabama, the storm brought strong winds and large waves to the Mobile area. After a wharf was flooded, authorities warned residents to seek higher ground. Businesses also moved their merchandise to the second floors of their buildings. Wharves, bathhouses, bales, barrels, and boxes washed away. The train system was also interrupted for a few days. A few ships, such as the schooner W W. Harkness and the steamboat Crescent suffered damage. Two oyster boats capsized and two people drowned. Winds downed fences, trees, and telegraph lines. Damage reached at least US$10,000. Later, flooding was reported in Virginia and Washington, D.C. The Potomac River rose considerably in some areas of Virginia and Washington, D.C., especially at Georgetown, where water reached the wharves. Two bridges nearly swept away. With the storm causing over 8 in (200 mm) of rain, crops, mill dams, and fences were damaged. In New York, strong winds destroyed a five-story warehouse and another adjoining building.

=== Hurricane Six ===
- Category 3 hurricane (SSHWS)
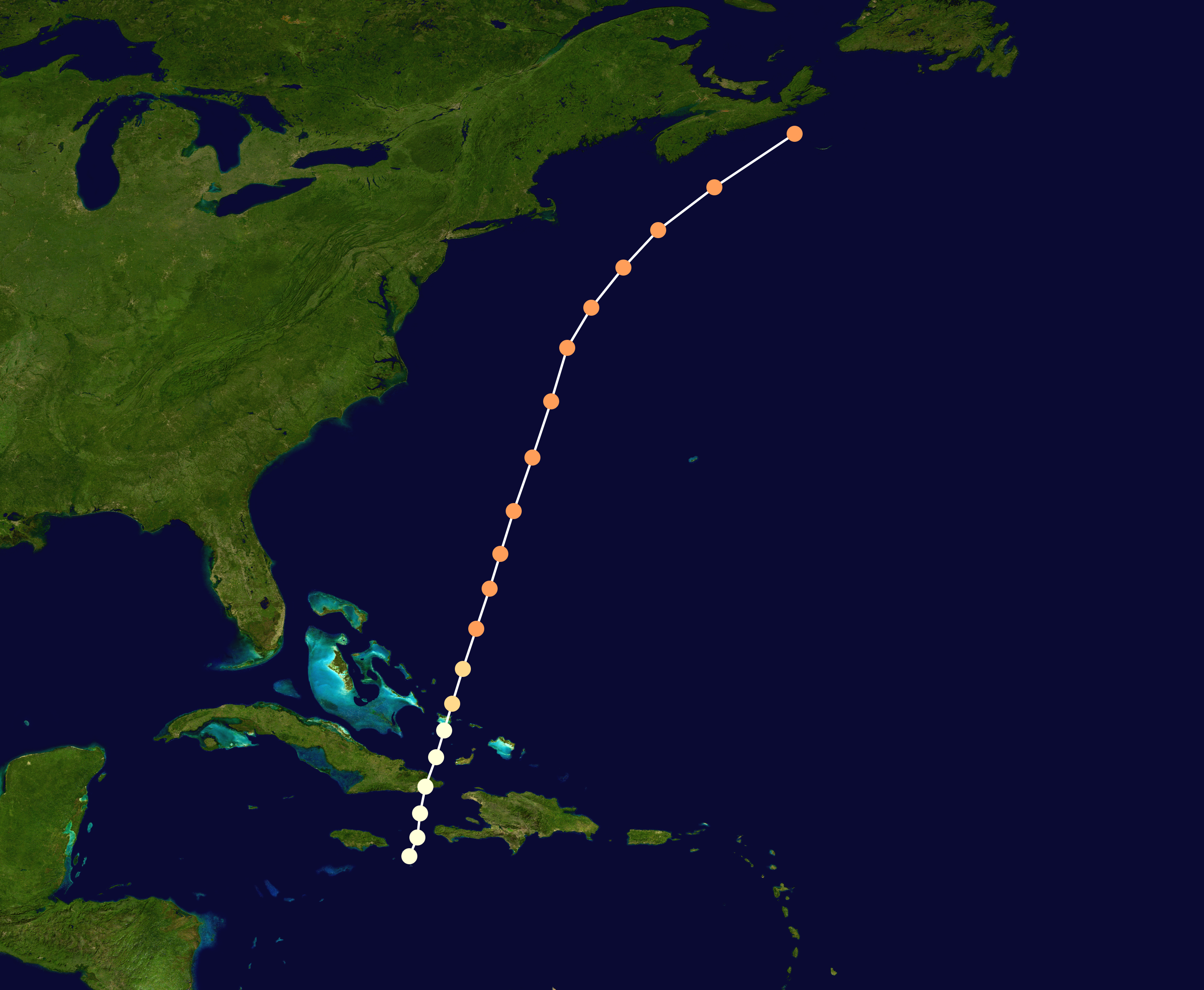
- Duration: October 2 – October 6
- Peak intensity: 125 mph (205 km/h) (1-min); 938 mbar (hPa)

The sixth storm of the season was first documented by Edward B. Garriott in 1900. After being first observed by a ship near Jamaica on October 2, the hurricane tracked northward over the extreme eastern tip of Cuba, according to its reconstructed track. Heavy weather was reported in Baracoa. The storm later reached southeastern Bahamas, where the cyclone severely impacted the Inagua region on October 2 and 3, destroying at least 25 boats. Several ships underway around Inagua endured rough seas and strong winds; "several of the crew and two soldiers" aboard one vessel wrecked by the hurricane died. Meteorological reports from ships confirm that the hurricane continued northward, passing about midway between Bermuda and the East Coast of the United States. On October 6, a vessel near the center of the storm recorded a barometric pressure of 938 mbar (27.7 inHg), signalling it was an intense hurricane even after it crossed the 40th parallel north. This was also the lowest pressure associated with the storm and was used to estimate that maximum sustained winds peaked at 125 mph (205 km/h). Also on October 6, a ship near Sable Island encountered the storm, which likely continued to approach the Canadian Maritimes. That day, the storm was last noted offshore Nova Scotia.

=== Tropical Storm Seven ===
- Tropical storm (SSHWS)
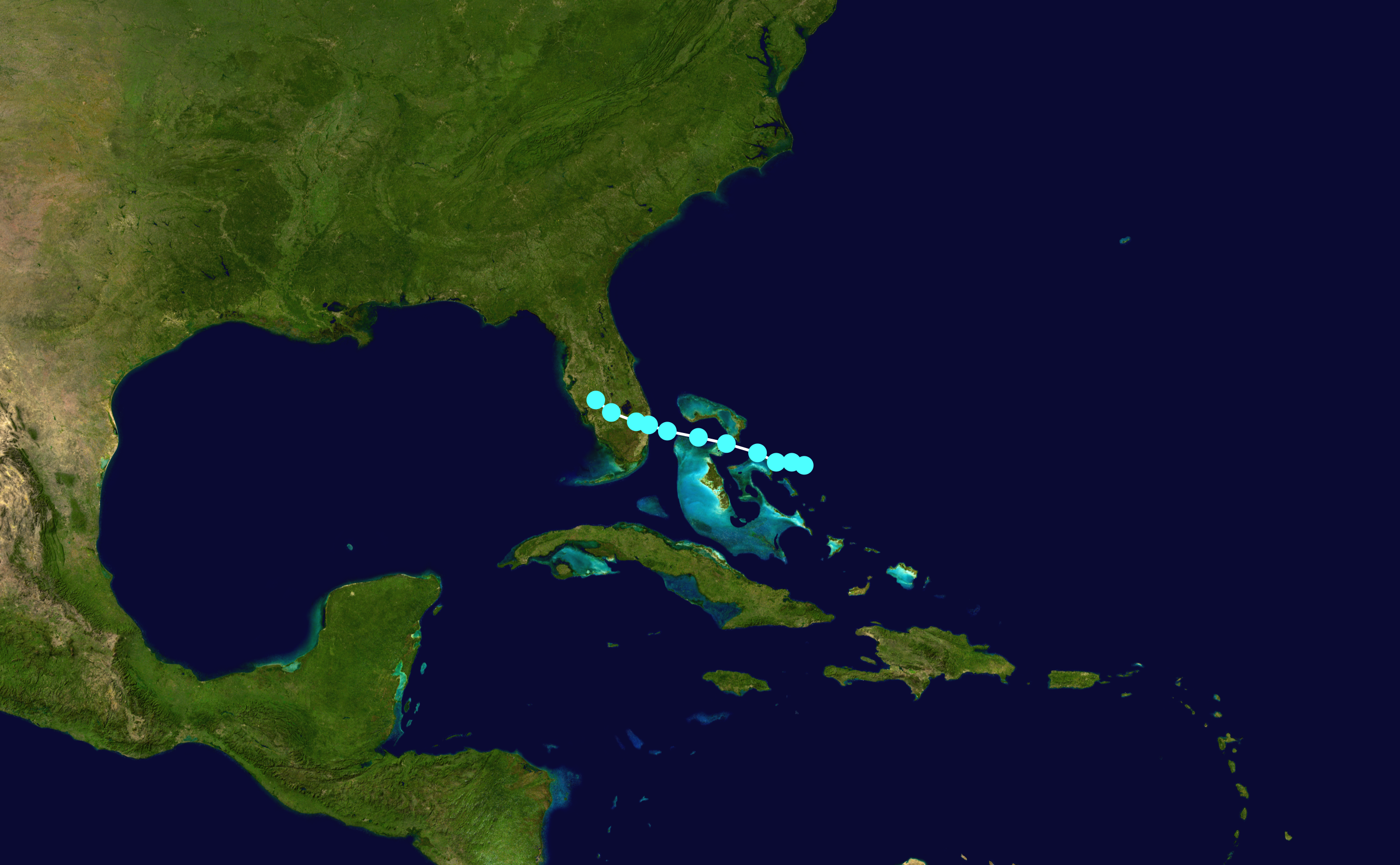
- Duration: October 16 – October 18
- Peak intensity: 70 mph (110 km/h) (1-min);

Beginning on October 16, ships throughout the central Bahamas experienced squally conditions accompanied by strong winds. Based on those reports, this storm was documented in 1995 as a west-northwestward-moving system. One ship ran aground on Paradise Island and another suffered a similar fate in the Abaco Islands. Continuing westward, the storm made landfall near modern-day Boca Raton, Florida, with winds of 70 mph (110 km/h) at 16:00 UTC on October 17. The system was last noted near present-day Arcadia early the following day.

=== Hurricane Eight ===
- Category 1 hurricane (SSHWS)
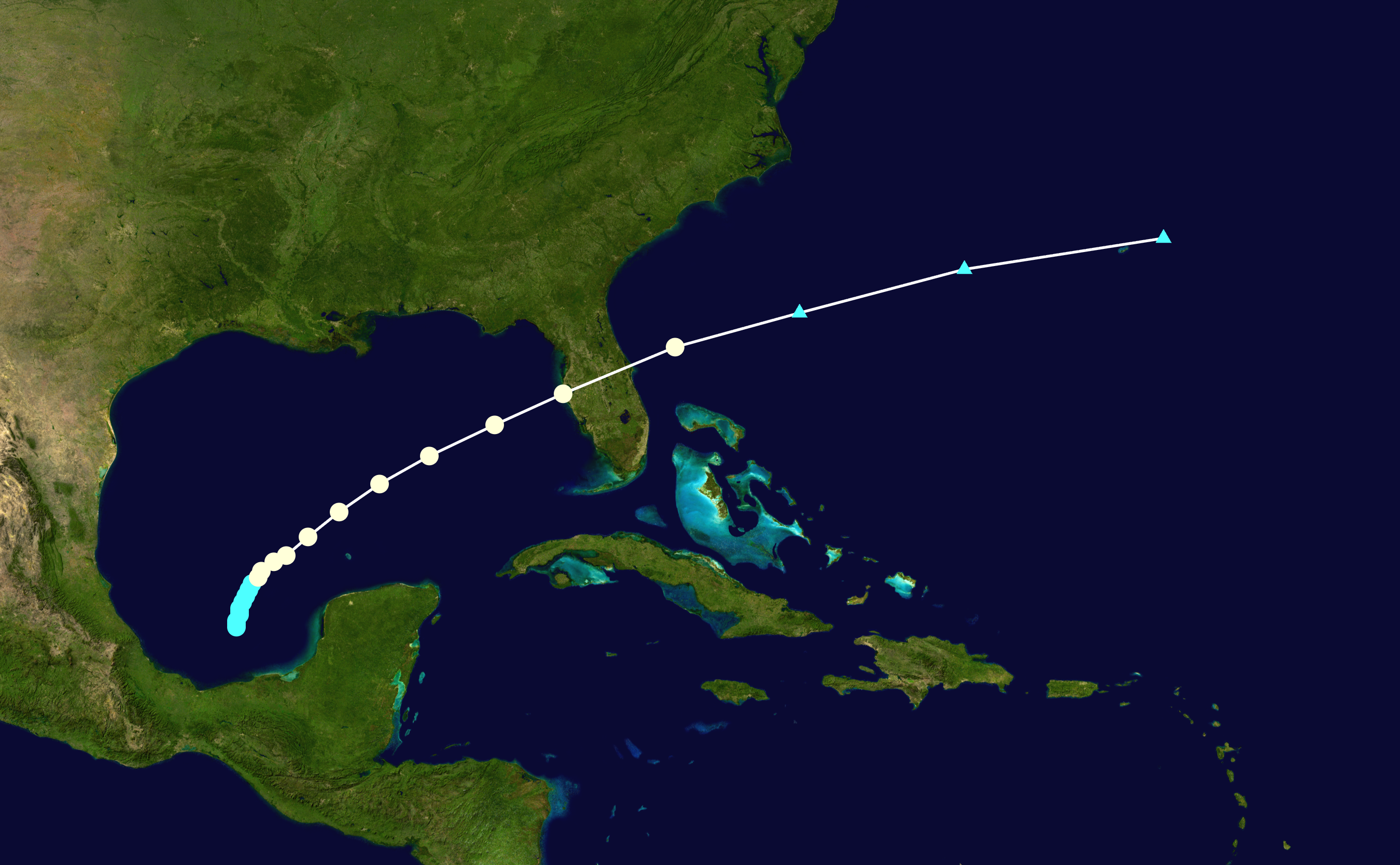
- Duration: October 24 – October 29
- Peak intensity: 90 mph (150 km/h) (1-min); 974 mbar (hPa)

A low pressure area developed over the Bay of Campeche between October 23 and October 24, with a tropical storm forming on the latter date. At least four other ships in that portion of the Gulf of Mexico sustained appreciable structural damage. One ship capsized in the storm with all hands lost except one seaman, who was picked up on November 2 by a passing vessel. The survivor said he was stranded on the wreck for five days, indicating that his ship went down on October 28. Stormy weather was reported near Bermuda. Partagás and Diaz used these reports to create a track for the storm. Initially, the storm drifted north-northeastward and northeastward. By 12:00 UTC on October 26, it was estimated that the system became a hurricane and intensified slightly further to peak at winds of 90 mph (150 km/h). Shortly thereafter, the hurricane began accelerating east-northeastward due to a cold front. At 18:00 UTC on October 28, the storm made landfall near St. Petersburg, Florida. A barometric pressure of 974 mbar (28.8 inHg) was observed, the lowest in relation to the storm. The storm emerged in the Atlantic less than six hours later and transitioned into an extratropical cyclone early on October 29.

== See also ==
- Atlantic hurricane season

== Season effects ==
This is a table of all of the known storms that formed in the 1859 Atlantic hurricane season. It includes their duration (within the basin), areas affected, damages, and death totals. Deaths in parentheses are additional and indirect (an example of an indirect death would be a traffic accident), but were still related to that storm. Damage and deaths include totals while the storm was extratropical, a wave, or a low, and all of the damage figures are in 1859 USD.

Saffir–Simpson scale
TD	TS	C1	C2	C3	C4	C5

1859 North Atlantic tropical cyclone season statistics
Storm name	Dates active	Storm category at peak intensity	Max 1-min wind mph (km/h)	Min. press. (mbar)	Areas affected	Damage (US$)	Deaths	Ref(s).
One	July 1	Category 2 hurricane	105 (165)	Unknown	Veracruz	Unknown	None	
Two	August 17–19	Category 2 hurricane	105 (165)	982	None	None	None	
Three	September 2–3	Category 1 hurricane	80 (130)	Unknown	Lesser Antilles (Saint Kitts and Saint Croix)	Unknown	None	
Four	September 12–13	Category 1 hurricane	80 (130)	Unknown	None	None	None	
Five	September 15–18	Category 1 hurricane	80 (130)	982	Eastern United States (Alabama)	>$10,000	2	
Six	October 2–6	Category 3 hurricane	125 (195)	938	Greater Antilles (Cuba), The Bahamas, Atlantic Canada	Unknown	>2	
Seven	October 16–18	Tropical storm	70 (110)	Unknown	The Bahamas, Florida	Unknown	None	
Eight	October 24–29	Category 2 hurricane	90 (150)	974	Florida	Unknown	None	
Season aggregates
8 systems	July 11 – October 29		125 (195)	938		>$10,000	>4	
