= 1914 Atlantic hurricane season =

- Season summary map

Seasonal boundaries
- First system formed: September 15, 1914 (record latest)
- Last system dissipated: September 19, 1914 (officially; with possible depression on October 26, 1914)

Strongest storm
- Name: One
  - Maximum winds: 70 mph (110 km/h) (1-minute sustained)
  - Lowest pressure: 995 mbar (hPa; 29.38 inHg)

Seasonal statistics
- Total depressions: 2, 1 unofficial (record low)
- Total storms: 1 (record low)
- Hurricanes: 0 (record low, tied with 1907)
- Major hurricanes (Cat. 3+): 0
- Total fatalities: None
- Total damage: Unknown

Related articles
- 1910–19 Pacific hurricane seasons; 1902-19 Pacific typhoon seasons; 1910s North Indian Ocean cyclone seasons

The 1914 Atlantic hurricane season was the least active Atlantic hurricane season on record, with only one known tropical storm. Although hurricane season typically encompasses a much larger time-span, actual activity was confined to the middle of September. The only tropical cyclone of the year developed in the region of The Bahamas on September 15, and drifted northwestward, moving inland over Florida and Georgia. Thorough warnings before the storm prevented any major damage. The 1914 season is one of only two that did not produce any hurricanes (the other being the 1907 season). Due to the lack of modern technology such as satellite imagery, information is relatively sparse, and an additional tropical depression may have existed in late October.

== Season summary ==
With only one official tropical cyclone, the 1914 season was the least active tropical cyclone season on record. It is one of only two Atlantic seasons without a storm of hurricane intensity (winds of 75 mph (121 km/h) or stronger), the other being the 1907 season. The sole tropical storm's formation on September 14 represents the latest start to a hurricane season since official records began in 1851.

Information on the 1914 season is chiefly based on data from the Atlantic hurricane database (HURDAT), which undertook a thorough reanalysis of hurricanes from 1911 through 1914 in 2005. Several changes, mostly of a minor nature, were made to the September tropical storm. Additionally, two other systems during the year were formally considered for inclusion into the hurricane database; one of them was deemed a potential tropical depression, but considered too weak to be classified a tropical storm. The other was assessed as a non-tropical system. The 2005 HURDAT reanalysis relied largely on historical weather maps and ship reports.

The season's activity was reflected with an accumulated cyclone energy (ACE) rating of 3, the lowest since official records began in 1851 and far below the 1911–1920 average of 58.7. ACE is a metric used to express the energy used by a tropical cyclone during its lifetime. Therefore, a storm with a longer duration will have high values of ACE. It is only calculated at six-hour increments in which specific tropical and subtropical systems are either at or above sustained wind speeds of 39 mph (63 km/h), which is the threshold for tropical storm intensity. Thus, tropical depressions are not included here.

== Systems ==
=== Tropical Storm One ===
- Tropical storm (SSHWS)
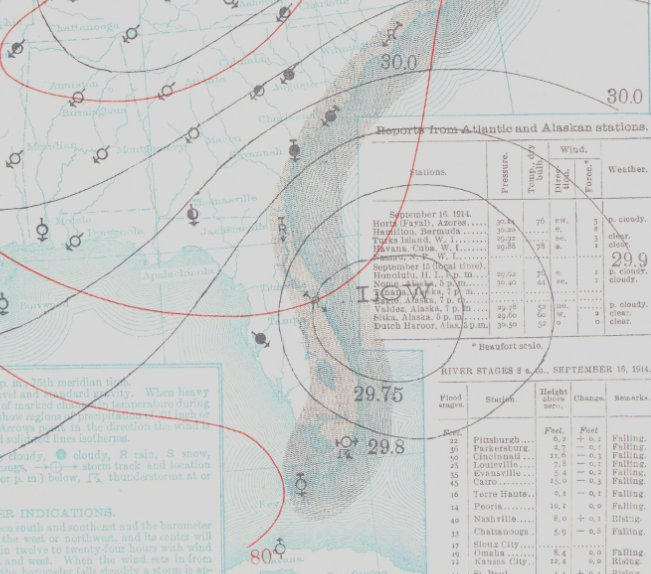
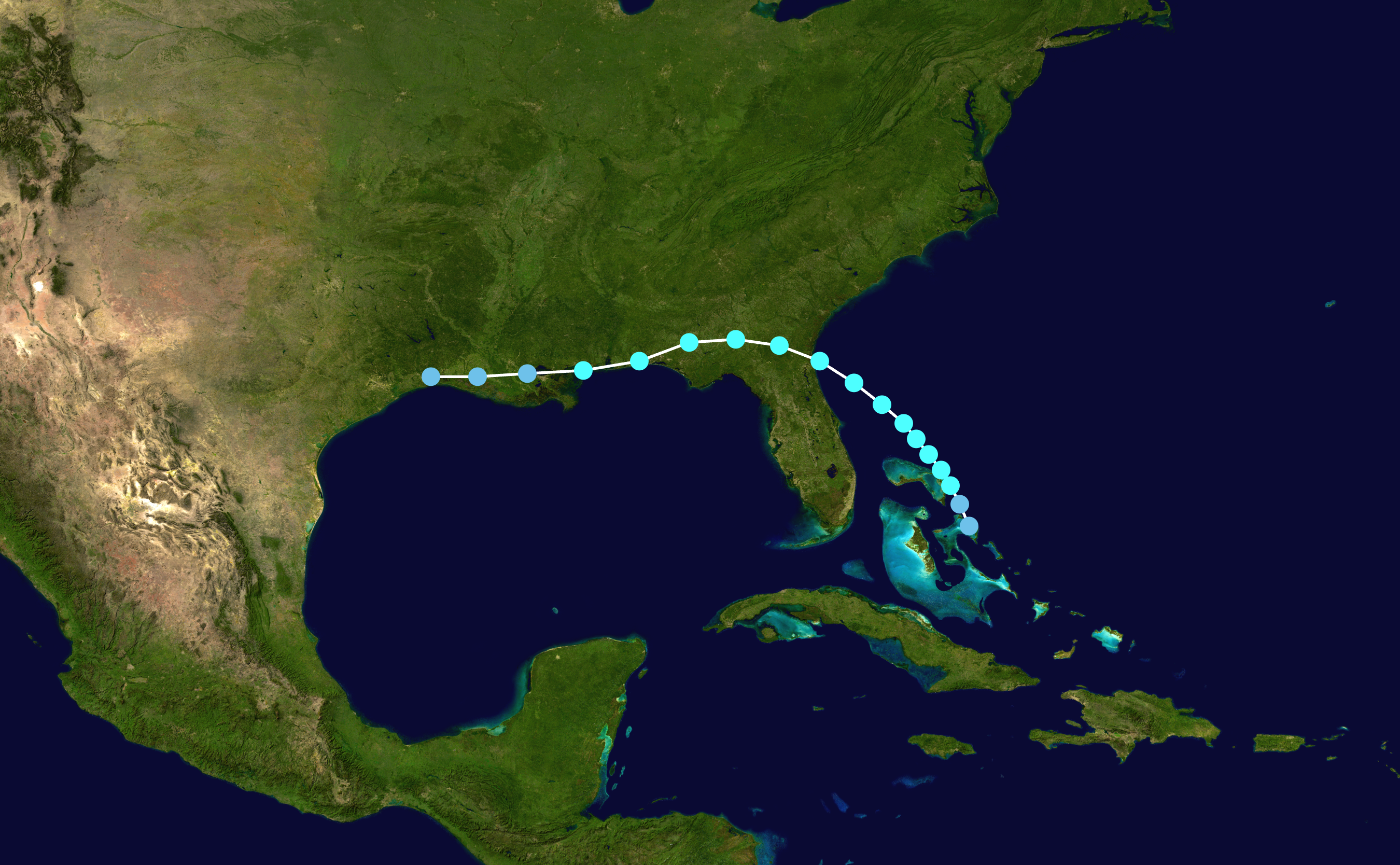
- Duration: September 15 – September 19
- Peak intensity: 70 mph (110 km/h) (1-min); <995 mbar (hPa)

The first and only tropical storm of the season originated in a westward-moving tropical wave denoted on weather maps from September 13. Decreases in air pressure occurred throughout the Bahamas, providing "strong indications of a disturbance". The system became a tropical depression at 00:00 UTC on September 15, approximately 200 mi (320 km) east of Miami, Florida. It strengthened into a tropical storm about 12 hours later, leading to the issuance of storm warnings from the east coast of Florida to as far north as Hatteras, North Carolina.

The system drifted northwest while gradually intensifying, and was situated south of the Georgia coast late on September 16. While most tropical systems in the vicinity tend to continue northward along the Eastern Seaboard, the cyclone curved westward and moved ashore near the Florida–Georgia state border after achieving a peak intensity with maximum sustained winds of 70 mph (110 km/h). It progressed inland over southern Georgia as it quickly weakened, but its intensity leveled off after around 18:00 UTC on September 17. The storm skirted the northern Gulf of Mexico as it swerved slightly south of due west, weakening to a tropical depression over southeastern Louisiana. By early September 19, the depression had further deteriorated into an open trough—a poorly defined, elongated area of low pressure.

The storm produced widespread rainfall in the Southeastern United States, accompanied by gale-force winds along the coast, and ships reported severe conditions at sea. High tides occurred around St. Augustine, Florida, washing over the South Street Causeway. Winds from the storm dispersed large amounts of dead grass from marshes in the area. No significant damage was reported due to thorough warnings before the cyclone. A 2005 reanalysis of the storm made some minor changes to its listing in the official hurricane database, setting back the time of formation and raising the peak intensity.

=== Other system ===
In addition to the September tropical storm, a possible depression developed in late October. On October 24, a broad area of low pressure was present over the western Gulf of Mexico and Caribbean Sea. A possible center of low pressure, attached to a cold front extending southward, had formed within the larger system and moved toward the east. Another center of low pressure formed in the northwestern Caribbean on October 25 and is considered a tropical depression in contemporary research. The depression had weak winds due to the light pressure gradient in the region and, at its peak, it had a minimum central pressure of 1,004 mbar (29.6 inHg). On October 26, the cold front associated with the extratropical cyclone to the north absorbed the tropical system. The next day, the extratropical system deteriorated into an open trough. Although the tropical low was reviewed for inclusion into the hurricane database as a tropical storm in 2005, it was deemed too weak.

== See also ==
- 1900–1940 South Pacific cyclone seasons
- 1900–1950 South-West Indian Ocean cyclone seasons
- 1910s Australian region cyclone seasons
