= 1888 Louisiana hurricane =

Category 3 Atlantic hurricane in 1888

Hurricane Three 1888 Louisiana hurricane
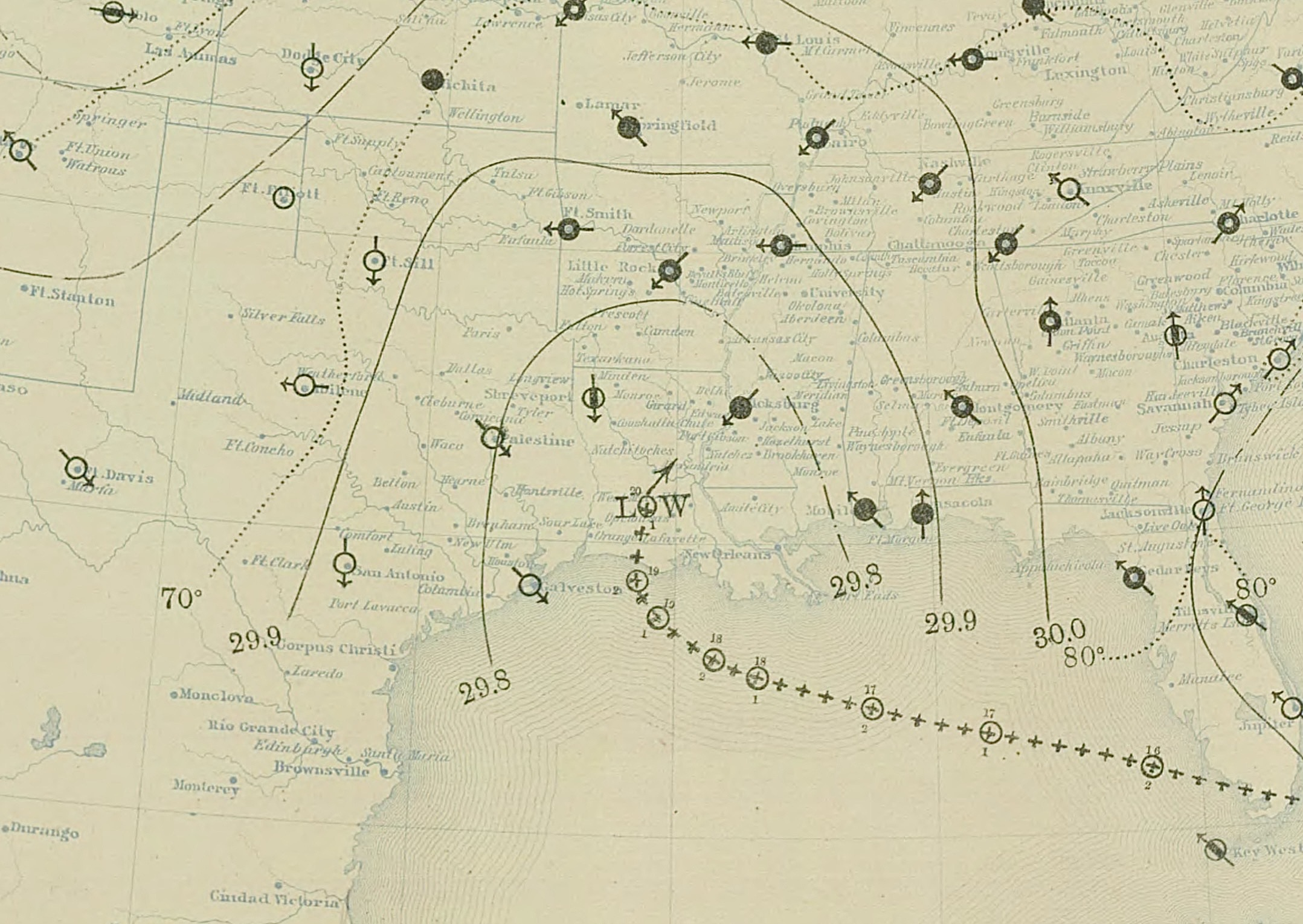
- Surface weather analysis on August 20, showing the hurricane shortly after landfall in Louisiana

Meteorological history
- Formed: August 14, 1888
- Extratropical: August 22, 1888
- Dissipated: August 24, 1888

Category 3 major hurricane
- 1-minute sustained (SSHWS/NWS)
- Highest winds: 125 mph (205 km/h)
- Lowest pressure: 945 mbar (hPa); 27.91 inHg (estimated)

Overall effects
- Fatalities: 12 indirect
- Damage: Unknown
- Areas affected: The Bahamas, Florida, Alabama, Mississippi, Louisiana, much of the Mississippi Valley, Mid-Atlantic states, and Northeastern United States
- Part of the 1888 Atlantic hurricane season

The 1888 Louisiana hurricane was a major hurricane that caused significant flooding and wind damage to the Mississippi River Delta and the Mississippi Valley in late August 1888. It was the third tropical cyclone and second hurricane of the 1888 Atlantic hurricane season.

== History ==
The cyclone first appeared north-northeast of the Turks and Caicos Islands, but may have formed earlier, undetected. It moved west-northwest, reaching hurricane intensity and making several landfalls in the Bahamas. In the island chain, the hurricane caused some damage to shipping, fruit groves, and fences, but apparently caused no known deaths.

The storm then peaked as the equivalence of a strong Category 3 hurricane before hitting South Florida near present-day Miami Beach. Few people then lived in the area, so damage was mostly minimal, but a large storm surge affected the coast, and areas farther north on the peninsula reported damage to fruit groves, communications wires, and boats. Afterward, the cyclone crossed the thinly populated southern peninsula into the Gulf of Mexico, which it reached as a weaker hurricane. Re-intensifying over the Gulf of Mexico, the hurricane attained a secondary peak intensity of 110 miles per hour (177 km/h) before hitting Louisiana at that intensity. Areas along the Gulf Coast reported significant, widespread destruction from heavy rains, storm surge, and high tides, especially in Louisiana, where the storm destroyed crops and blew down buildings.

The storm then curved northeast into New England before transitioning into an extratropical low-pressure area. The outer bands of the storm produced gale-force winds in the region and nearby Mid-Atlantic states, downing loose objects such as tree branches, awnings, and wires. Heavy rains washed out transportation networks like roads and railroads, but the worst effects were from a tornado outbreak; several significant tornadoes hit the Mid-Atlantic region, one of which caused 10 of the 12 reported deaths in the outbreak.

== Meteorological synopsis ==
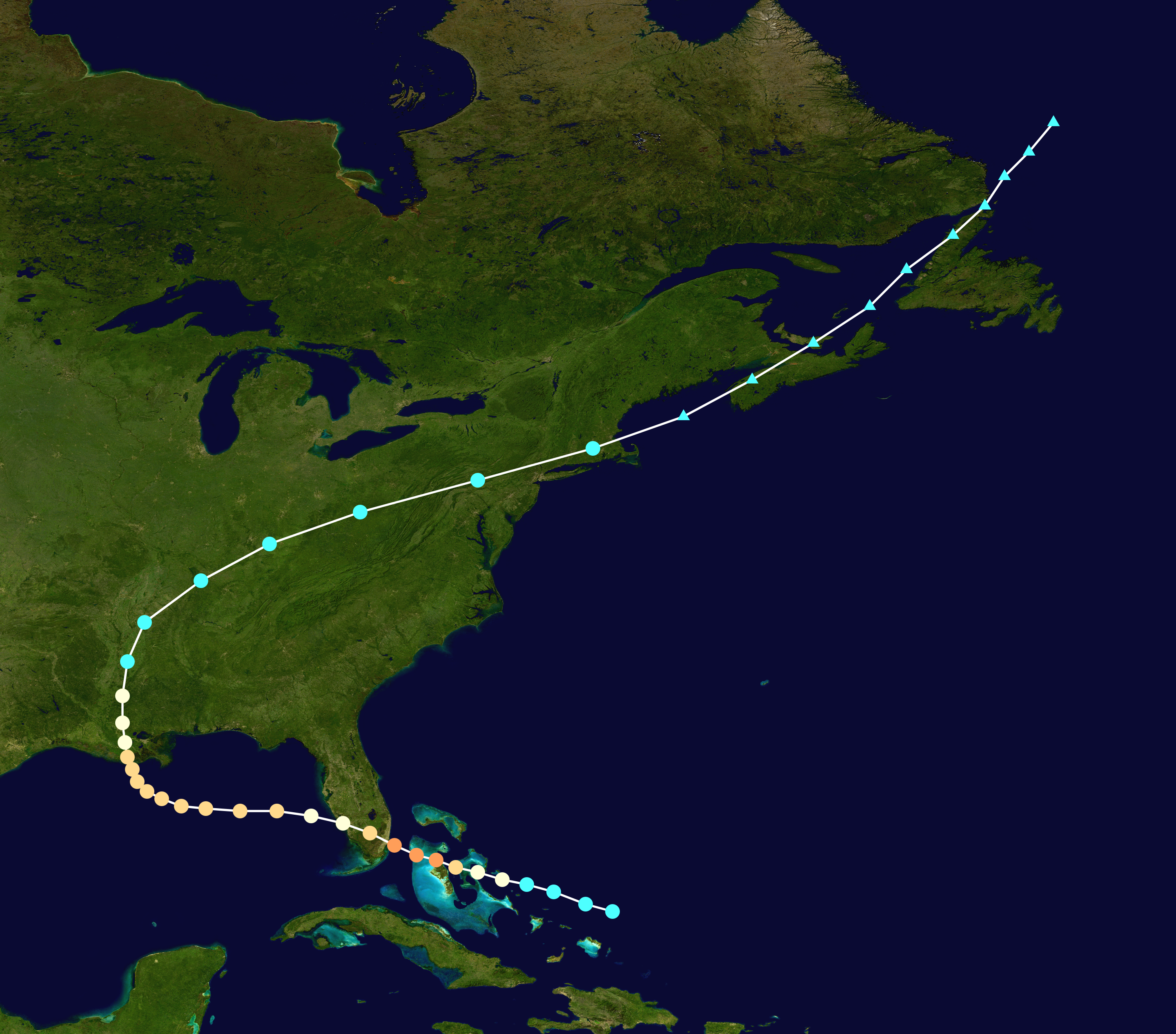
Map plotting the storm's track and intensity, according to the Saffir–Simpson scale Map key Saffir–Simpson scale Tropical depression (≤38 mph, ≤62 km/h) Tropical storm (39–73 mph, 63–118 km/h) Category 1 (74–95 mph, 119–153 km/h) Category 2 (96–110 mph, 154–177 km/h) Category 3 (111–129 mph, 178–208 km/h) Category 4 (130–156 mph, 209–251 km/h) Category 5 (≥157 mph, ≥252 km/h) Unknown Storm type Tropical cyclone Subtropical cyclone Extratropical cyclone, remnant low, tropical disturbance, or monsoon depression

By 12:00 UTC on August 14, a weak tropical storm with winds of 40 mph (64 km/h) formed about 100 miles (161 km) north-northeast of the Turks and Caicos Islands. Operationally, the U.S. Signal Corps, responsible for weather forecasting at the time, did not issue updates on the system until August 16, when observations first indicated a low-pressure area off the coast of South Florida. (The precise formative date of the cyclone was not documented in available observations, and may have occurred earlier than officially estimated.) Upon formation, the cyclone moved west-northwest toward The Bahamas—then a British crown colony and overseas territory—and steadily strengthened. As a strong tropical storm, the cyclone made its first landfall on the northern tip of San Salvador Island, then known as Watlings Island until 1925. It first attained hurricane intensity by 12:00 UTC on August 15, exactly 24 hours after formation. As it reached hurricane intensity, the storm made its second landfall on Cat Island in The Bahamas with maximum sustained winds of 80 mph (129 km/h). Continuing on its west-northwestward course, the hurricane passed over the northern islands of Exuma with winds of 90 mph (145 km/h). Afterward, it strengthened further to the equivalent of a modern Category 2 hurricane on the Saffir-Simpson hurricane wind scale, with winds of 105 mph (169 km/h). Around 00:00 UTC on August 16, the center, or eye, of the cyclone passed 20 mi (32 km) south of the Bahamian capital Nassau, on New Providence Island. Still pursuing a track to the west-northwest, the cyclone made a fourth landfall on the northern portion of Andros Island. It then crossed the island in fewer than six hours, and by 06:00 UTC on August 16 it became a major hurricane—equivalent to a modern Category 3 on the Saffir–Simpson hurricane wind scale—with winds of 115 mph (185 km/h).

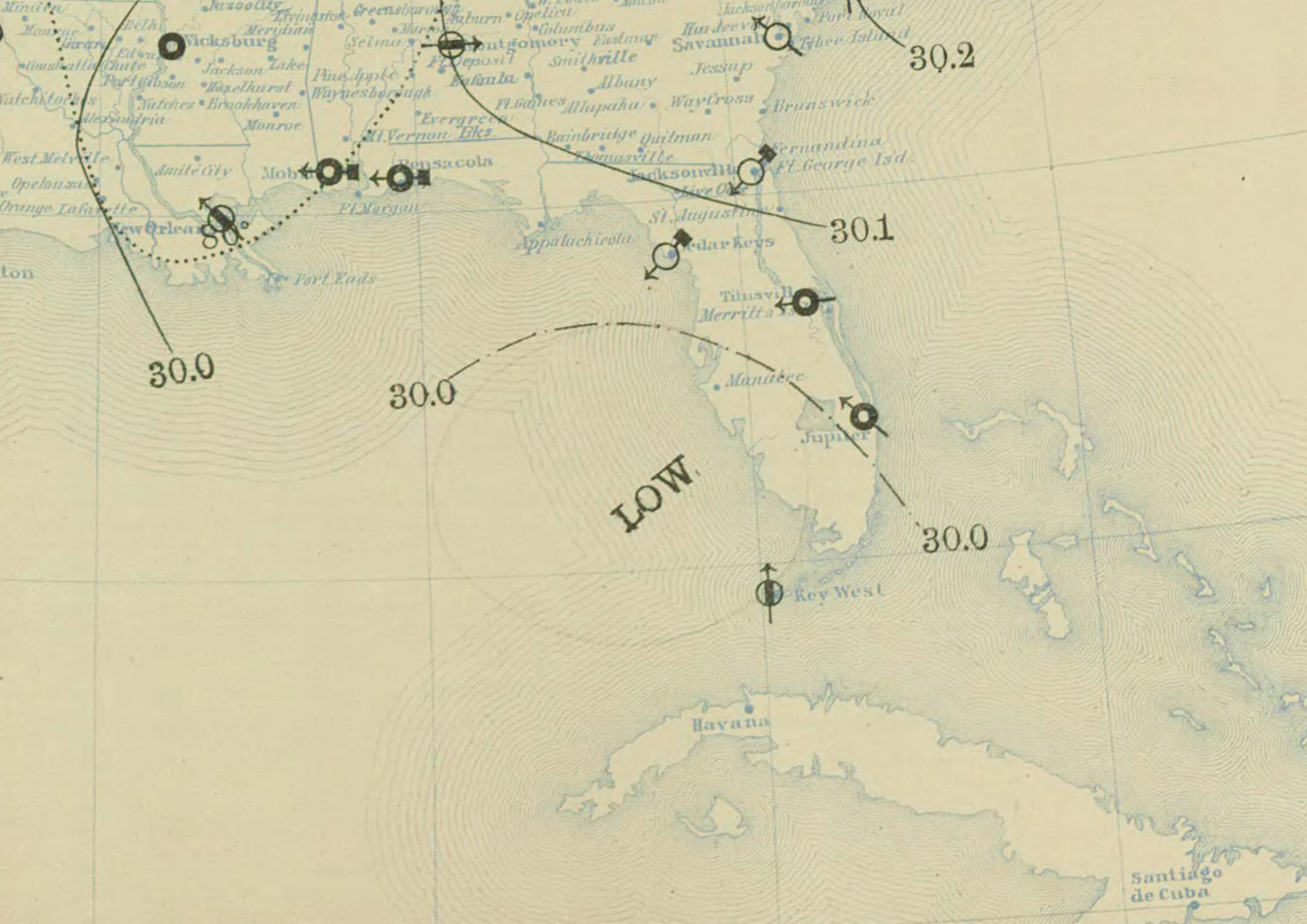
Weather map of the hurricane moving into the Gulf of Mexico on August 16

After reaching major hurricane status, the cyclone approached the Gulf Stream off the southeast coast of Florida. By 12:00 UTC on August 16, it attained its first and strongest peak intensity of 125 mph (201 km/h), near the upper threshold of the modern Category 3 on the Saffir-Simpson hurricane wind scale. About seven hours later, the hurricane struck the coast of South Florida, just north of present-day Miami Beach, at its peak intensity. (The point of landfall was near the present-day site of Upper Eastside in Miami.) Although few observations were available near the inner core of the cyclone, scientific reassessment conducted by the Atlantic hurricane reanalysis project determined that the central pressure at landfall was likely close to 945 millibars (27.91 inHg), based primarily upon an observed storm surge value. The hurricane is one of 15 major hurricanes to have impacted southeast Florida since official records in the Atlantic hurricane database (HURDAT) began in 1851. After striking South Florida—now defined as part of the Miami metropolitan area—the cyclone weakened as it moved inland over the Everglades, passing well to the south of Lake Okeechobee. By 06:00 UTC on August 17, the cyclone reached the coast of Southwest Florida near present-day Cape Coral; due to interaction with land, its maximum sustained winds had decreased to 80 mph (129 km/h), equivalent to a modern Category 1 on the Saffir-Simpson hurricane wind scale. The storm then passed out into the Gulf of Mexico near present-day Matlacha and Cayo Costa State Park.

After entering the Gulf of Mexico off Southwest Florida, the cyclone began to re-intensify and turn to the west. By 18:00 UTC on August 17, the hurricane regained winds equivalent to those of a modern Category 2 hurricane on the Saffir-Simpson hurricane wind scale. After having traveled west-northwest for its entire lifespan, at this time its path shifted to the west and began to approach the northern U.S. Gulf Coast. By 00:00 UTC on August 18, the cyclone attained its second peak intensity of 110 mph (177 km/h), just below the modern Category 3 on the Saffir-Simpson hurricane wind scale. As it neared the coast of Louisiana, the hurricane maintained its intensity while gradually turning to the northwest and north-northwest.

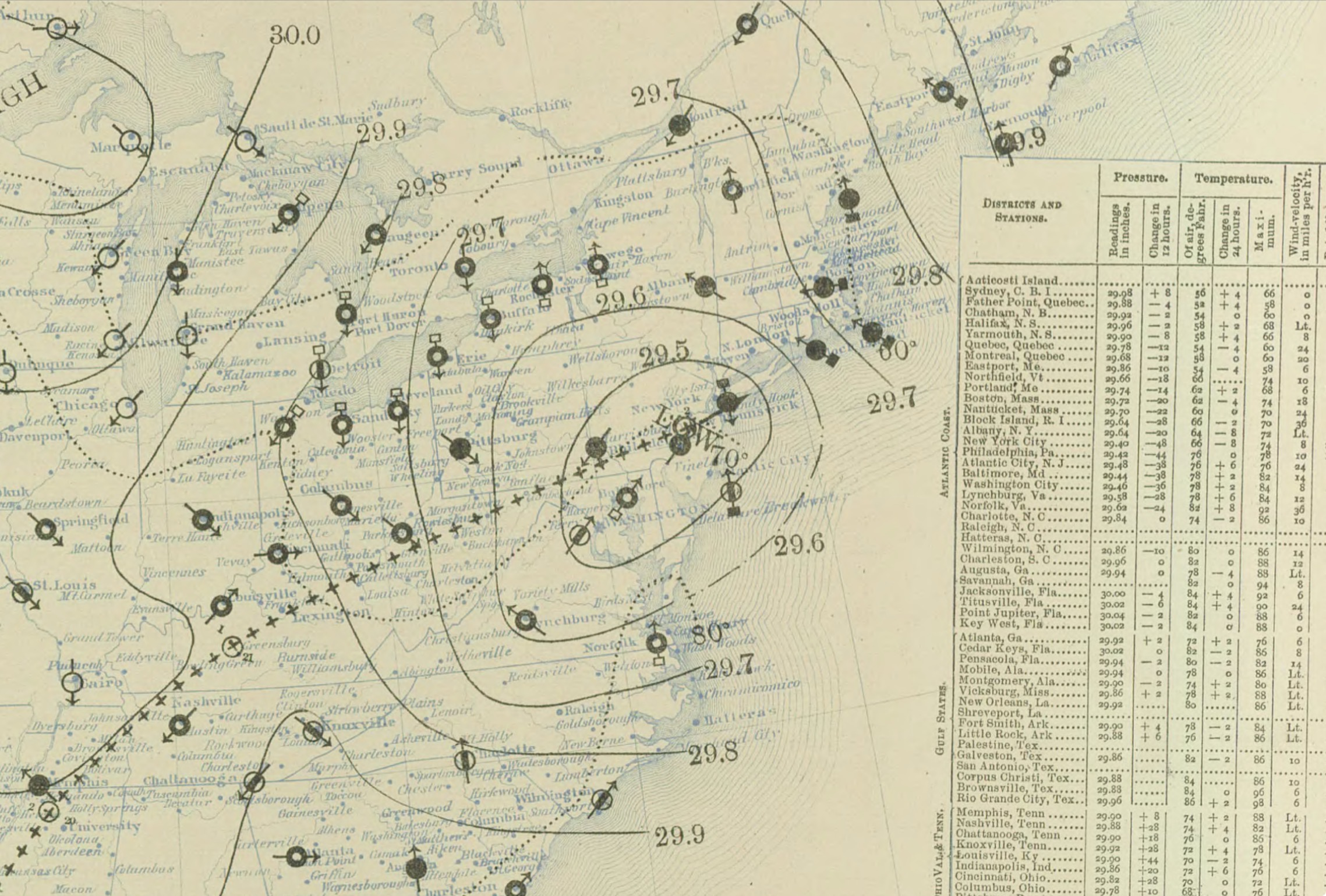
Weather map of the extratropical remnants of the hurricane over New Jersey on August 21

Around 16:00 UTC on August 19, the center of the cyclone made landfall just south of Cocodrie in Terrebonne Parish with winds of 110 mph (177 km/h). As it moved inland over the marshes of southern Louisiana, the hurricane turned northward and slowly weakened. By 18:00 UTC on August 20, the cyclone weakened to a strong tropical storm as it neared the town of Greenville in western Mississippi. Its path gradually inclined to the northeast and accelerated over the Mississippi Valley, reaching the Mid-Atlantic region by 00:00 UTC on August 22. Early on August 22, the storm passed over southern New England, and by 12:00 UTC it became extratropical while centered about 80 mi (129 km) south of Bar Harbor, Maine. The extratropical cyclone was last positioned northeast of Newfoundland and Labrador at 18:00 UTC on August 24.

== Preparations and impact ==
As the hurricane passed through The Bahamas, it damaged fruit trees, crops, and fences, especially on the Abaco Islands, Harbour Island, and New Providence. According to the New York Times, winds in Nassau, on New Providence, shifted from northeast and southwest, lasting about eight hours, but causing only slight damage to nearby shipping.

The hurricane affected few people in South Florida, striking a portion of the coast that was largely unpopulated and devoid of major settlements. Nevertheless, the cyclone produced widespread damage over much of the region, extending as far north as Sebastian. The highest wind speed reported in South Florida was below hurricane intensity—only 60 mph (97 km/h) at Point Jupiter—and only modest rainfall of 2.02 in (51 mm) was measured at the same location. The highest winds on the east coast of Florida occurred at Sebastian Inlet and were estimated to have reached minimal hurricane intensity, 75 mph (121 km/h), from the northeast. The strong winds downed trees and telegraph poles; additionally, many small boats were reportedly pushed ashore, and nearby fruit groves sustained "several thousand dollars" in damage. Although the storm mostly produced minimal damage, it reportedly generated a large storm surge of 14 feet (4.3 m) "on the beaches near Miami"—one of the highest on record in South Florida. The surge was comparable to the 14–15 ft (4.3–4.6 m) visually estimated from Coconut Grove in the 1926 Miami hurricane—in fact, it was even higher than the officially measured value of 13.2 ft (4.0 m) in Miami from the same storm—and was only exceeded by the 16.89 ft (5.1 m) measured at the Burger King International Headquarters near Cutler in Dade County during Hurricane Andrew in 1992. However, little information is available about the circumstances of the storm surge value reported in 1888.

As the hurricane passed into the Gulf of Mexico, high tides and strong winds affected the northern U.S. Gulf Coast, beginning in the Big Bend and the Florida Panhandle. The town of Cedar Key experienced light rain as the storm passed well to its southwest. The town also witnessed peak winds of 42 mph (68 km/h) that led to reports of yachts capsizing. The Florida Panhandle, closer to the center of the storm, experienced much higher winds and sustained heavier damages. Winds of 60 mph (97 km/h) affected the town of Pensacola, causing significant damage to property in the area. Farther west, other communities reported even more severe damage due to high tides and storm surge. For instance, the city of Mobile, Alabama, experienced one of its worst floods on record as a storm surge caused the Mobile River to overflow, submerging the Mobile waterfront to a depth of 3 ft (0.91 m) and spreading floodwater two to three blocks inland. Strong winds that peaked at 55 mph (89 km/h) in the city topped trees, blew down fences, and unroofed some homes. Some damage occurred along the Mississippi coast as waves washed out some coastal structures and winds prostrated trees. However, the worst damage occurred in the Mississippi River Delta, just to the east of the center, where severe flooding left large sections of countryside underwater. Severe damage occurred to crops in the area, particularly rice and sugarcane: entire rice fields were flooded to a depth of several feet, and much of the sugarcane crop was flattened by strong winds. In the Bayou Teche country, the hurricane blew down numerous outbuildings, unroofed numerous homes, and destroyed some large dwellings and churches. After the storm, growers estimated that 30–60% of the rice crop sustained damage. In many areas at least one-third of the timber was downed.

In the Mid-Atlantic region and southern New England, the storm produced gale-force winds and heavy rainfall, washing out numerous railroad bridges and tracks. Strong winds reached 38 mph (61 km/h) in Norfolk, Virginia, and 44 mph (71 km/h) in New Haven, Connecticut. The winds blew down awnings, signs, and tree branches. In Delaware and Maryland, the cyclone spawned numerous tornadoes—five of which were "significant" (F2 or greater) on the Fujita scale—that killed at least 12 people. One or more tornadoes may have hit Springfield and Glendale in Montgomery County, Maryland, north of Washington, D.C., destroying a church, a dwelling, and a blacksmith's shop. Winds downed large oak trees, "shattering a car" in the county. One tornado caused a large cannery, two stories tall, to collapse, killing 10 people under mounds of debris near Still Pond, Maryland.

== Bibliography ==
- Barnes, Jay (1998), Florida's Hurricane History, Chapel Hill Press, ISBN 0-8078-4748-8
- Duedall, Iver W.; Williams, John M. (2002), Florida Hurricanes and Tropical Storms, 1871-2001, University Press of Florida, ISBN 978-0813024943
- Grazulis, Thomas P. (1993), Significant Tornadoes 1680–1991: A Chronology and Analysis of Events, The Tornado Project of Environmental Films, ISBN 1-879362-03-1
