= 1888 Atlantic hurricane season =

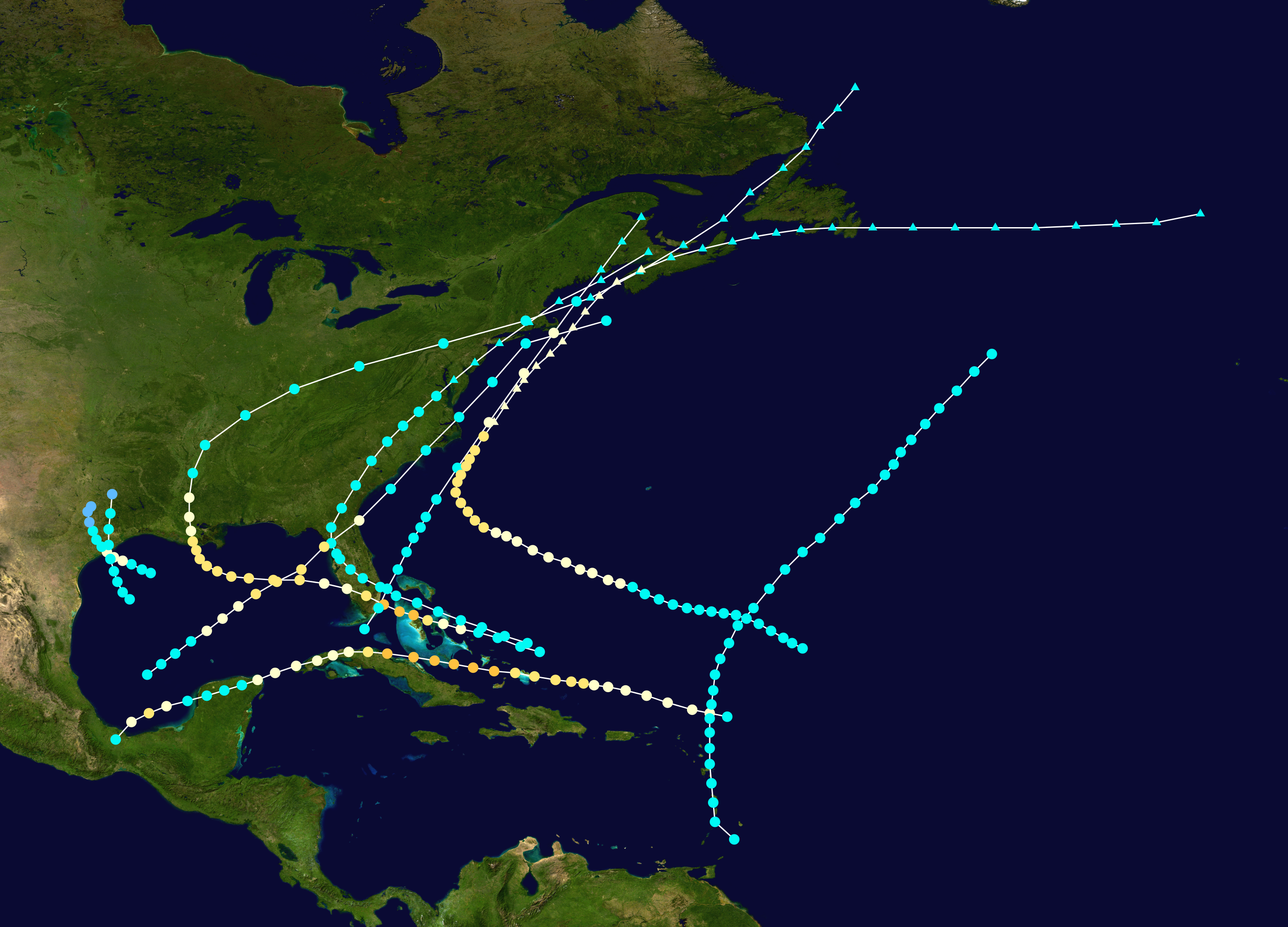
- Season summary map

Seasonal boundaries
- First system formed: June 16, 1888
- Last system dissipated: November 25, 1888

Strongest storm
- Name: Three
  - Maximum winds: 125 mph (205 km/h) (1-minute sustained)
  - Lowest pressure: 945 mbar (hPa; 27.91 inHg)

Seasonal statistics
- Total storms: 9
- Hurricanes: 6
- Major hurricanes (Cat. 3+): 2
- Total fatalities: 958
- Total damage: > $1 million (1888 USD)

The 1888 Atlantic hurricane season was significantly less active compared to the previous season but still featured several landfalls in the United States. Overall, the season had nine tropical cyclones, six of which intensified into hurricanes, while two of those became major hurricanes. (Note: A major hurricane is a storm that ranks as Category 3 or higher on the Saffir–Simpson hurricane wind scale.) However, in the absence of modern satellites and other remote-sensing technologies, only storms that affected populated land areas or encountered ships at sea are known, so the actual total could be higher. An undercount bias of zero to six tropical cyclones per year between 1851 and 1885 and zero to four per year between 1886 and 1910 has been estimated. The first system was initially detected over the northwestern Gulf of Mexico on June 16, while the ninth and final storm transitioned into an extratropical cyclone offshore North Carolina on November 25.

Neither meteorologists José Fernández-Partagás and Henry F. Diaz in 1996 nor the Atlantic hurricane reanalysis project in the early 21st century added or removed any previously undocumented storms from the official hurricane database (HURDAT). However, both modified the tracks of several cyclones. More recently, a 2014 reanalysis study by climate researcher Michael Chenoweth recommended the removal of the second storm and the addition of six cyclones not currently listed in HURDAT, but these proposals have not yet been approved.

The most intense tropical cyclone of the season, the third system, peaked as a Category 3 hurricane on the present-day Saffir–Simpson scale with maximum sustained winds of 125 mph (205 km/h) in August. Striking the Bahamas, Florida, and Louisiana at hurricane intensity, the cyclone caused damage throughout its path and 12 deaths. The next system, also a Category 3 hurricane, crossed the Turks and Caicos Islands, the Bahamas, and Cuba before making two landfalls in Mexico in early September, inflicting more than $1 million (1888 USD) in damage and 921 fatalities, (Note: All damage figures are in 1888 USD, unless otherwise noted) mostly in Cuba. Later, the season's seventh system drowned nine people at Cedar Key, Florida, and the ninth and final storm resulted in sixteen deaths, fifteen due to maritime incidents. Overall, the cyclones of the 1888 season collectively caused more than $1 million in damage and killed 958 people.

== Seasonal summary ==
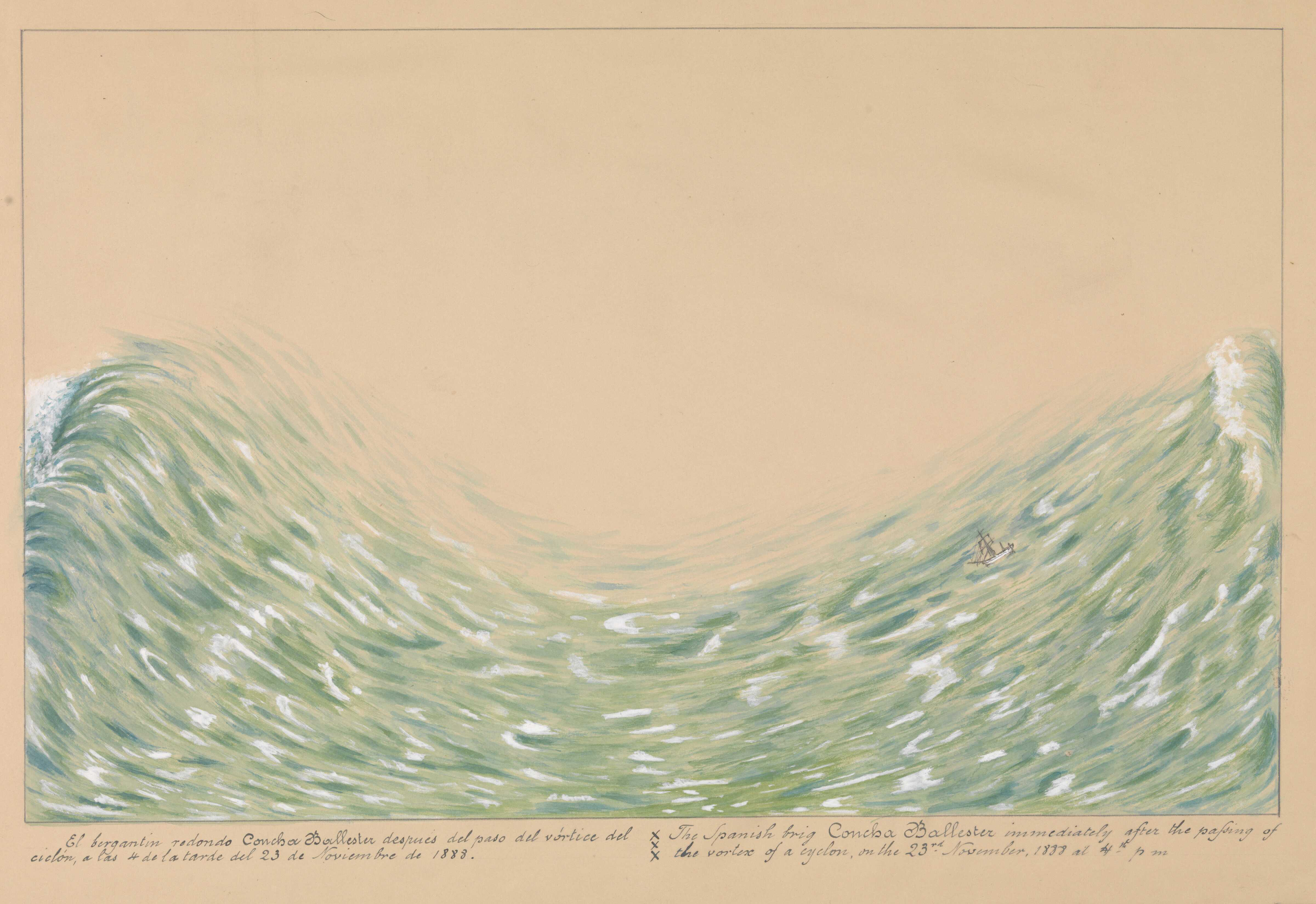
The Spanish brig Concha Ballester immediately after the passing of the vortex of a cyclone, on November 23, 1888, at 4 pm

The Atlantic hurricane database (HURDAT) officially recognizes that nine tropical cyclones formed during the 1888 season, six of which strengthened into hurricanes, while two of those intensified into major hurricanes. Neither meteorologists José Fernández-Partagás and Henry F. Diaz in 1996 nor the Atlantic hurricane reanalysis project in the early 21st century added or removed any previously undocumented storms from HURDAT, though both modified the tracks of several cyclones. However, a more recent reanalysis by climate researcher Michael Chenoweth, published in 2014, adds six storms and removes one – the second system – for a net gain of five cyclones, although these proposed changes have yet to be approved for inclusion to HURDAT. Chenoweth's study utilizes a more extensive collection of newspapers and ship logs, as well as late 19th century weather maps for the first time, in comparison to previous reanalysis projects.

Tropical cyclogenesis began by June 16, when a tropical storm was detected over the northwestern Gulf of Mexico. Striking Texas as a hurricane on June 17, the system dissipated on the following day. The next storm, which existed in early July, also made landfall in Texas. More than a month passed before the next known cyclone developed east of the Turks and Caicos Islands on August 14. Peaking with maximum sustained winds of 125 mph (205 km/h) and a minimum atmospheric pressure of 945 mbar (27.9 inHg), the storm made landfall in the Turks and Caicos Islands, the Bahamas, Florida, and Louisiana at hurricane intensity and moved across the Eastern United States before becoming extratropical offshore New England on August 22. A storm that later peaked with an equal maximum sustained wind formed on August 31 and struck the Turks and Caicos Island, the Bahamas, Cuba, and Mexico at hurricane intensity in early September. Two cyclones developed in September, both of which struck Florida, while the second of the two, the season's sixth storm, made landfall in Massachusetts as a hurricane and Maine as a tropical storm. October featured one storm, a Category 2 hurricane that struck Florida and North Carolina. In November, two systems developed, the second of which, the ninth storm, transitioned into an extratropical cyclone offshore North Carolina on November 25, ending seasonal activity. Overall, the cyclones of the 1888 season collectively caused over $1 million in damage and 958 fatalities.

The season's activity was reflected with an accumulated cyclone energy (ACE) rating of 85, significantly lower than the previous two seasons but the fifth highest of the decade. ACE is a metric used to express the energy used by a tropical cyclone during its lifetime. Therefore, a storm with a longer duration will have higher values of ACE. It is only calculated at six-hour increments in which specific tropical and subtropical systems are either at or above sustained wind speeds of 39 mph (63 km/h), which is the threshold for tropical storm intensity. Thus, tropical depressions are not included here.

== Systems ==
=== Hurricane One ===
- Category 1 hurricane (SSHWS)
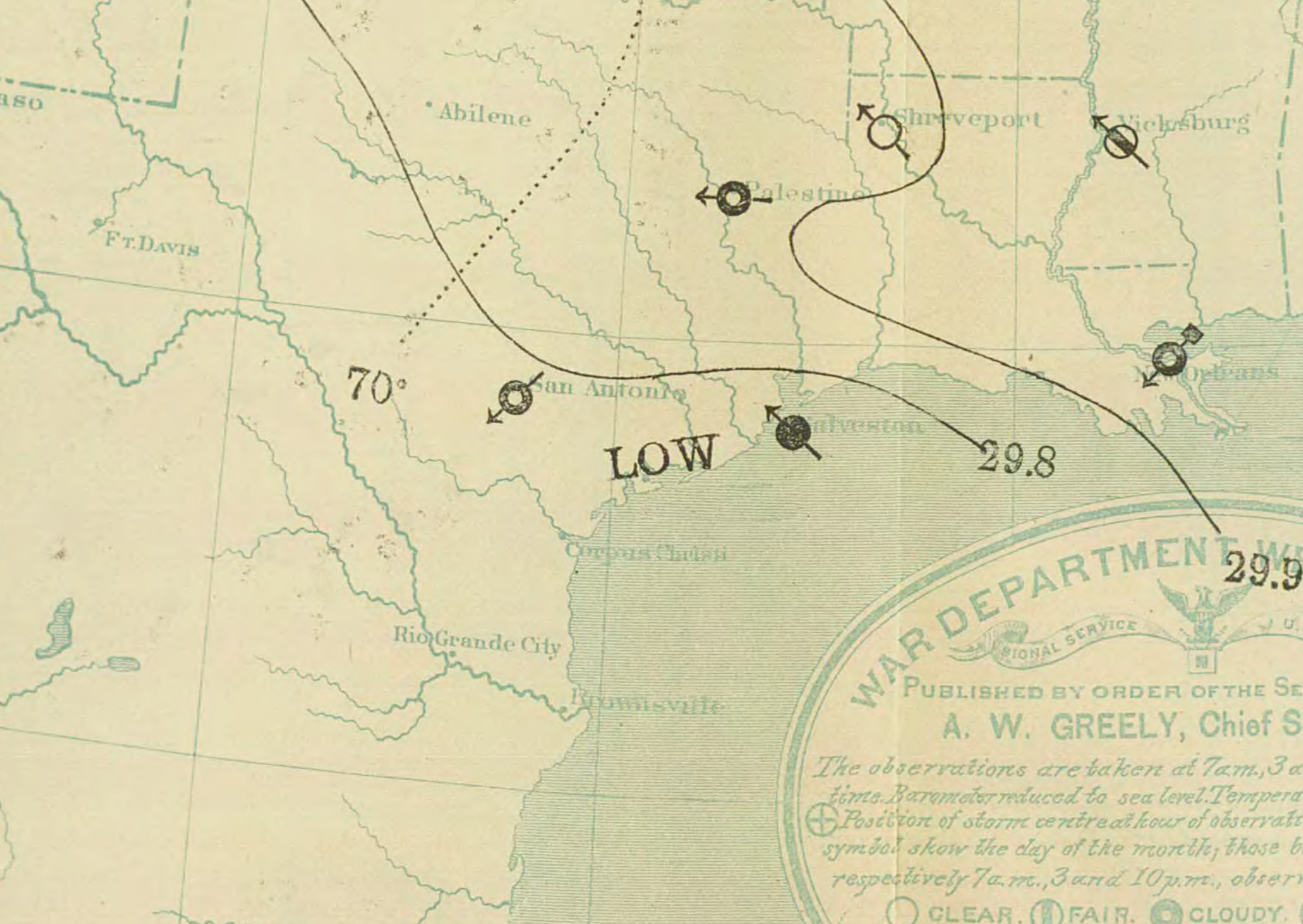
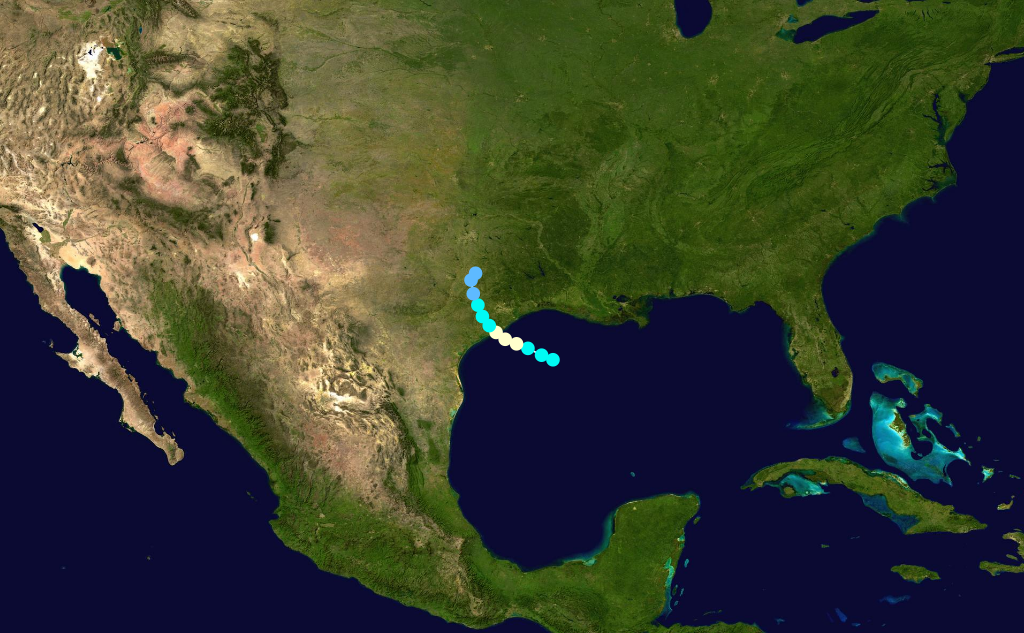
- Duration: June 16 – June 18
- Peak intensity: 80 mph (130 km/h) (1-min); 985 mbar (hPa)

The first cyclone of the season existed by 00:00 UTC on June 16 in the northwestern Gulf of Mexico, based on Brownsville, Texas, recording sustained winds of 28 mph (45 km/h). Due to sparse observations, the system may have developed prior to this time, but was not detected. Centered about 200 mi (320 km) southeast of Galveston Island on July 16, the cyclone moved west-northwestward and quickly strengthened, becoming a hurricane several hours later. It peaked with sustained winds of 80 mph (130 km/h) early on June 17, and made landfall southwest of Bay City, Texas, over the eastern end of East Matagorda Bay around 06:00 UTC. Turning to the northwest after landfall, it quickly degenerated into a tropical storm, gradually turning northward over time. The cyclone weakened into a tropical depression around 06:00 UTC, and lost its status as a cyclone just 12 hours later near Waco. Climate researcher Michael Chenoweth proposed that this storm approached Texas on a north-northwestward course and made landfall as a tropical storm, without ever attaining hurricane status.

In Texas, the cyclone produced heavy rain, peaking at 6.4 in (163 mm) over a 16-hour period at Galveston. The highest measured winds reached 54 mph (87 km/h) in the city. Along the coast of Texas, the lowest measured pressure was 1,005 mbar (29.69 inHg) at Corpus Christi, about 120 mi (195 km) southwest of the landfall location. The Atlantic hurricane reanalysis project estimated that the minimum central pressure in the storm was likely close to 985 mbar (29.09 inHg) at the time of landfall. Operationally, the U.S. Signal Corps—predecessor to the U.S. Weather Bureau (now the National Weather Service)—did not classify the system as an area of low pressure, and as such, it did not appear in the June 1888 track map of cyclones in the Monthly Weather Review, the official publication of the Signal Corps. However, as early as June 17, The New York Times noted that a moderate storm was apparently approaching Texas.

=== Tropical Storm Two ===
- Tropical storm (SSHWS)
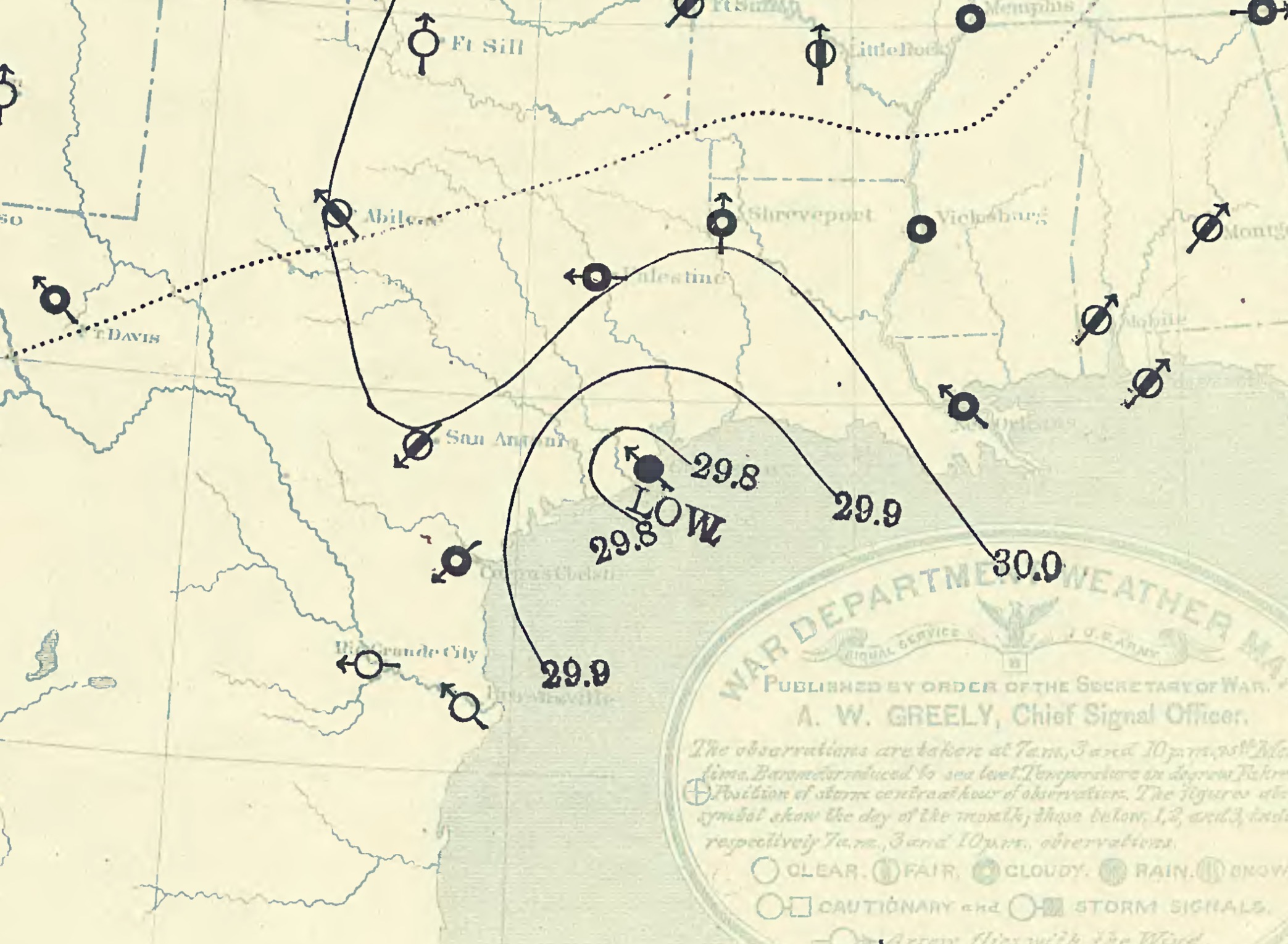
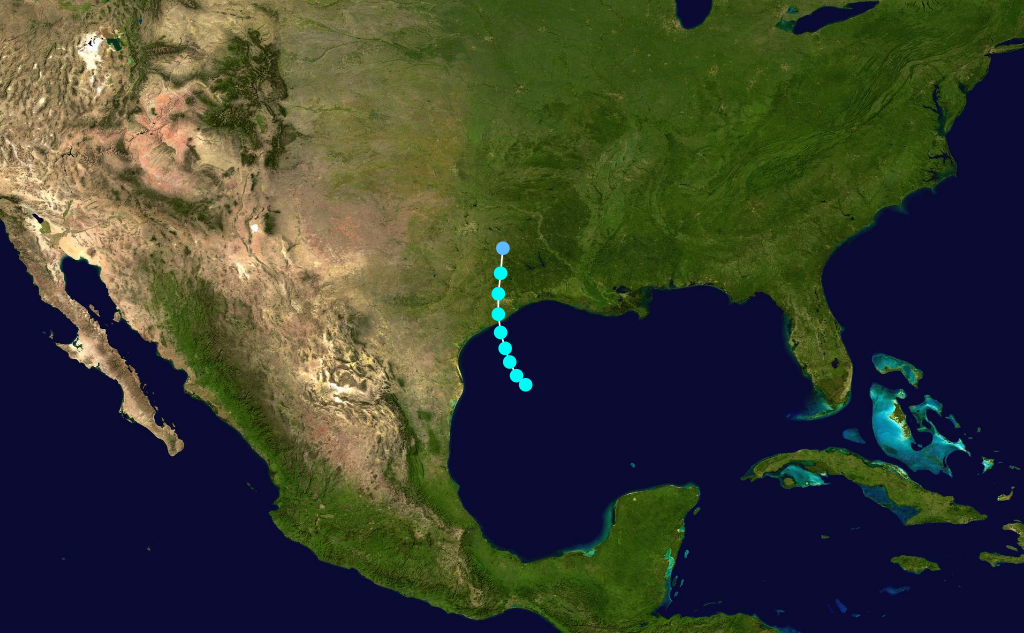
- Duration: July 4 – July 6
- Peak intensity: 60 mph (95 km/h) (1-min); ≤1008 mbar (hPa)

Based on a 1993 reanalysis led by meteorologist C. J. Neumann, the second tropical storm of the season originated about 200 mi (320 km) east of the mouth of the Rio Grande, on the Texas–Mexico border. It moved north-northwest, attaining its peak intensity of 60 mph (95 km/h) by 00:00 UTC on July 5. About 16 hours later, the moderate tropical storm made landfall at that intensity just east of Bay City—impacting the same region as the previous storm. The cyclone turned north and north-northeast after striking land, slowly weakening as it did so. By 12:00 UTC on July 6, the cyclone was last positioned over northwestern Cherokee County, Texas. Chenoweth proposed the removal of this storm from HURDAT, finding "No evidence in land-based reports or from ships".

In Texas, the storm produced peak winds of 42 mph (68 km/h) in Galveston, and the lowest measured pressure was 1,008 mbar (29.78 inHg) in the city. Like the preceding storm, the cyclone produced heavy rain over parts of Texas, especially in the Palestine area in Anderson County. In this area, a shower of pebbles, each ranging from 1/8–1/4 in (3.2–6.3 mm) in diameter and irregularly shaped, was reported to have occurred, possibly due to a tornado or waterspout that touched down at an unknown distance from Palestine.

=== Hurricane Three ===
- Category 3 hurricane (SSHWS)
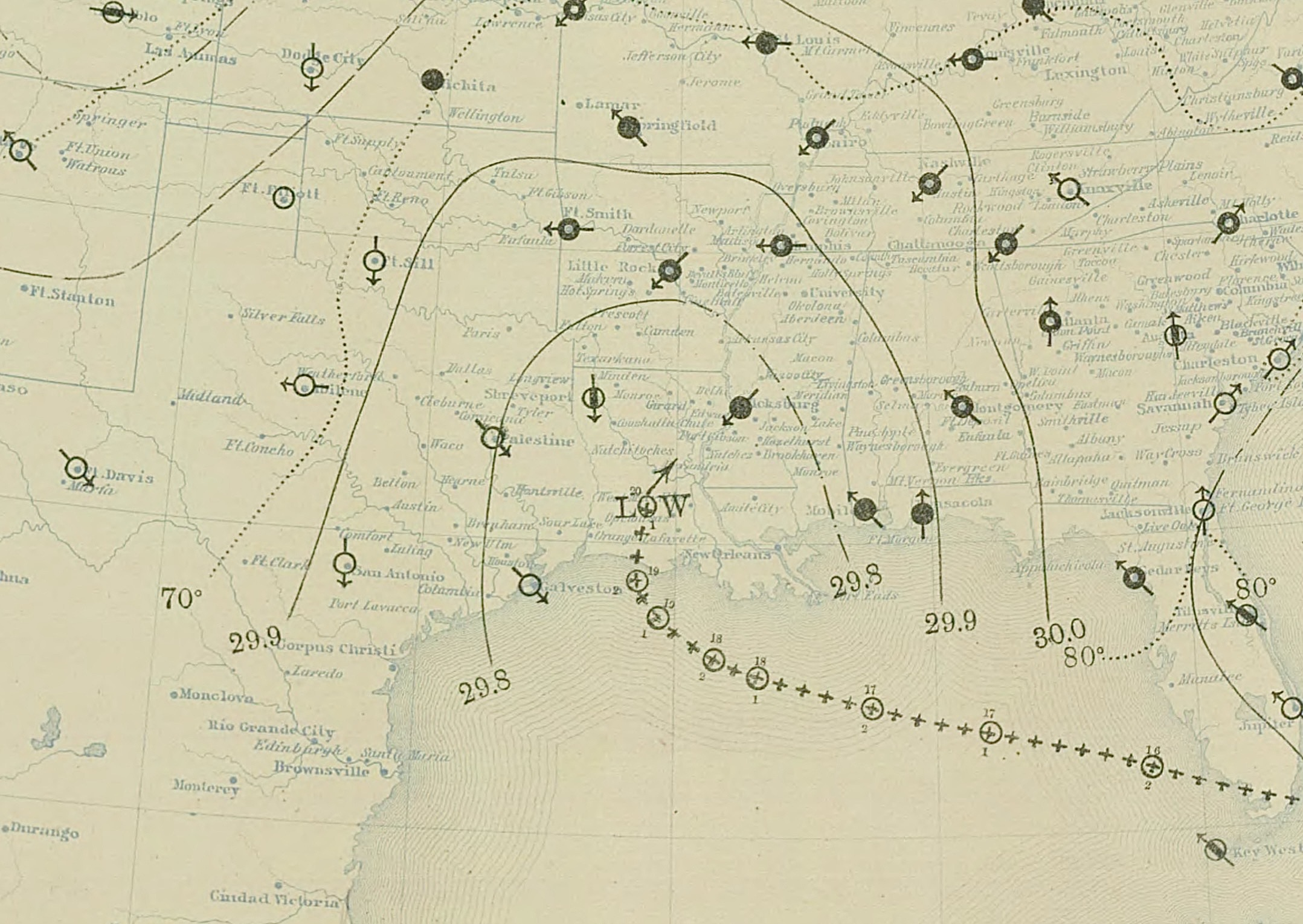
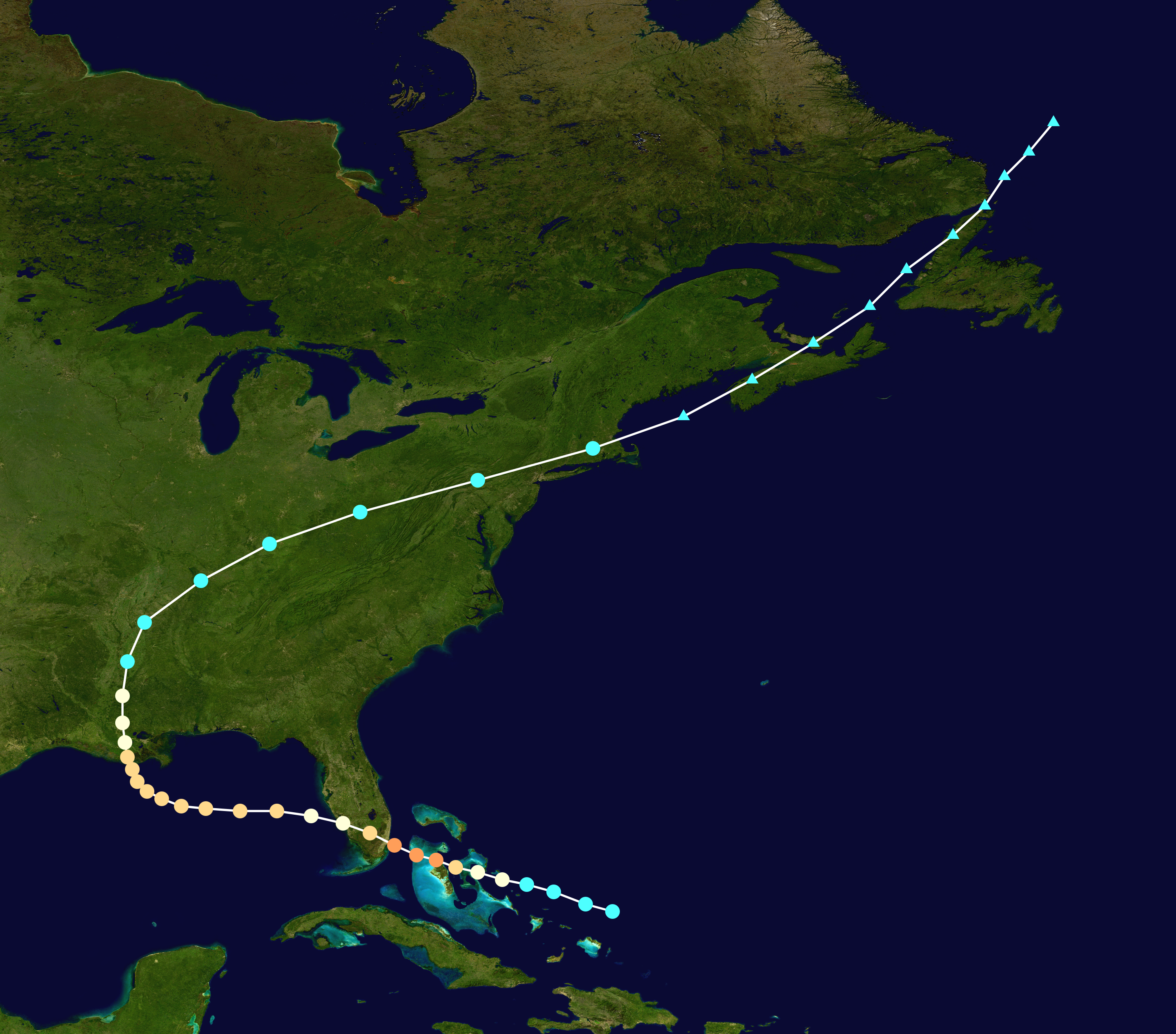
- Duration: August 14 – August 24 (extratropical on August 22)
- Peak intensity: 125 mph (205 km/h) (1-min); 945 mbar (hPa)

This system was first detected by 12:00 UTC on August 14, while centered about 100 mi (155 km) north-northeast of Grand Turk Island. Moving west-northwestward, the storm intensified into a hurricane about 24 hours later. It made landfall on Cat Island in The Bahamas and then Andros Island on August 16. As it approached southeast Florida, the storm strengthened into the equivalence of a Category 3 major hurricane, peaking with winds of 125 mph (205 km/h) and a barometric pressure of 945 mbar (27.9 inHg) by 12:00 UTC on August 16. Around 19:00 UTC, it made landfall close to present-day Miami Beach at peak intensity; its estimated winds were derivative of observable storm surge heights near the point of landfall. The cyclone weakened over land and emerged into the Gulf of Mexico near Cayo Costa on August 17 as a Category 1 hurricane. However, the hurricane quickly re-intensified into a Category 2 hurricane early on August 18 as it turned westward. Curving northwestward and then north-northwestward, the cyclone struck near Cocodrie, Louisiana, with winds of 110 mph (175 km/h) around 16:00 UTC on August 19. The hurricane turned northward after moving inland and weakened to a tropical storm late on August 20, over Mississippi before curving to the northeast. After passing over New England, the storm became extratropical by 12:00 UTC on August 22, while the remnants crossed Atlantic Canada prior to dissipating over the Labrador Sea on August 24. Chenoweth proposed few significant changes to this storm, other than more dramatic weakening over the interior of the United States; however, he downgraded it to Category 1 at landfall on South Florida, owing to a lack of reliable firsthand data sources.

In the Bahamas, the hurricane damaged fruit trees, crops, and fences, especially on the Abaco Islands, Harbour Island, and New Providence. Despite South Florida at the time being thinly peopled, "widespread" damage occurred as far north as Sebastian, according to hurricane historian Jay Barnes. The highest wind reported in South Florida was 60 mph (95 km/h) at Jupiter, and the heaviest rainfall was 2.02 in (51 mm) at that location. Farther north, winds at Sebastian Inlet were estimated at 75 mph (120 km/h), downing trees and telegraph poles, beaching many small boats, and causing local fruit groves "several thousand dollars" in damage, according to an account by the local meteorological observer quoted in the Monthly Weather Review. Additionally, the hurricane reportedly produced a storm surge of 14 ft (4.3 m) near Miami, though the reliability of this report has been questioned by Chenoweth. In the Big Bend region of Florida, several yachts capsized at Cedar Key. Winds in Pensacola peaked at 60 mph (95 km/h), badly damaging local property. Slightly lesser winds in Mobile, Alabama, prostrated trees and fences, and deroofed a few homes. Flooding from the storm surge inundated the waterfront to a depth of 3 ft (0.91 m) and areas as far as two to three blocks inland from the Mobile River. Along the Mississippi River Delta, the storm produced severe flooding. Rainfall in New Orleans totaled 7.9 in (201 mm) over a 12-hour period, and winds in the city reached an estimated 90 mph (145 km/h), unroofing many buildings, felling numerous trees, and blowing down fences. In many areas, strong winds downed at least one-third of the timber, and damage to rice, sugarcane, corn, and cotton crops was significant. The storm produced heavy rainfall and high winds along much of its path across the Mississippi Valley, the Mid-Atlantic states, and the Northeastern United States, while tornadoes in the Mid-Atlantic caused 12 deaths.

=== Hurricane Four ===
- Category 3 hurricane (SSHWS)
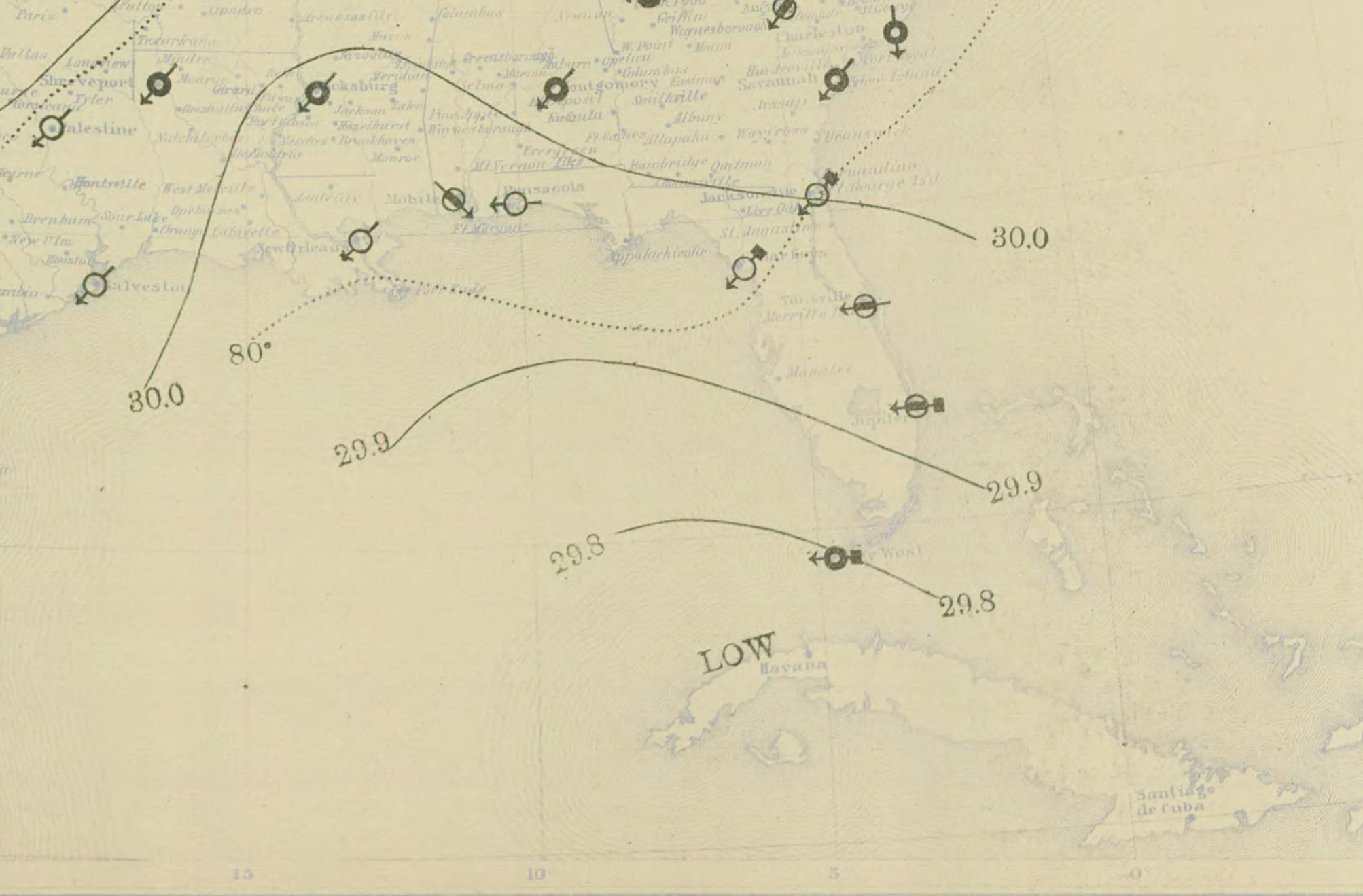
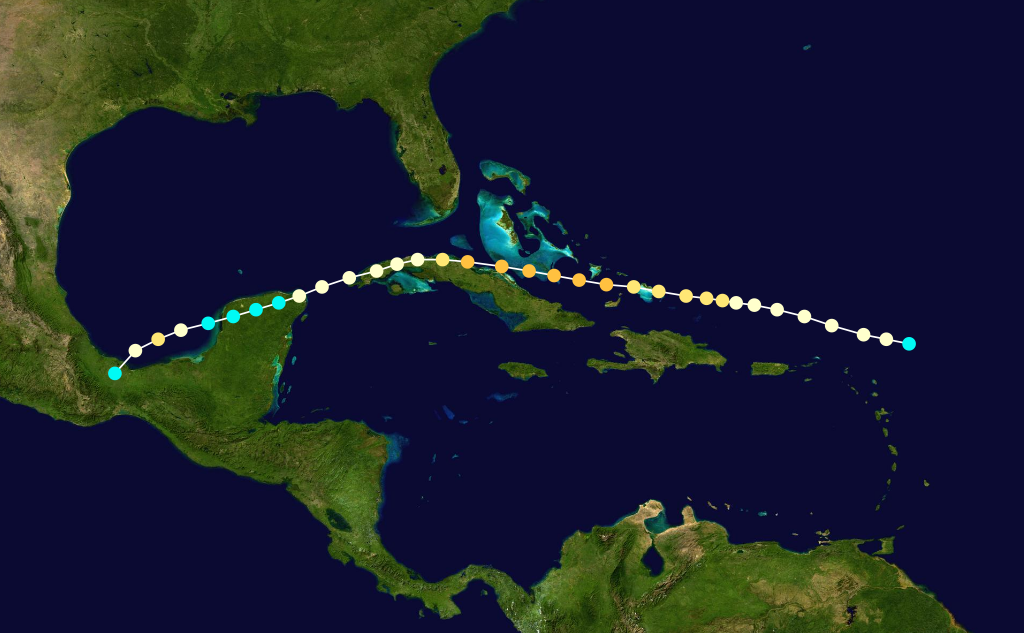
- Duration: August 31 – September 8
- Peak intensity: 125 mph (205 km/h) (1-min); ≤972 mbar (hPa)

The steamship Jamaica first encountered this system on August 31 about 150 mi (240 km) northeast of Sombrero, an outlying island of Anguilla. Initially a tropical storm, the system strengthened to a hurricane later that day. The storm intensified further, reaching Category 2 intensity prior to striking the Turks and Caicos Islands around 18:00 UTC on September 2. About 24 hours later, the cyclone peaked as a Category 3 hurricane with maximum sustained winds of 125 mph (205 km/h). On September 4, the storm made landfall along the coast of modern-day Villa Clara Province. Weakening to a Category 1 hurricane by early on the following day, the system turned southwestward over Cuba and remained over land until emerging into the Yucatán Channel several hours later. The hurricane then crossed the channel and made landfall near the northeastern tip of the Yucatán Peninsula on September 6. After weakening to a tropical storm, it briefly re-strengthened into a Category 2 hurricane while moving southwestward in the Bay of Campeche. Thereafter, the storm weakened back to a Category 1 prior to its landfall near Coatzacoalcos, Veracruz, early on September 8 and soon dissipated. A reanalysis study by Chenoweth argued that this cyclone actually developed as a tropical depression near the Cabo Verde Islands on August 25 and later may have clipped the north coast of the Yucatán Peninsula instead of moving across it, striking the Mexican mainland as a major hurricane.

Although the storm remained well north of Puerto Rico, heavy rainfall caused flooding that killed more than 100 people, 30 of them in Ponce after the Portugués River overflowed. The main bridge in Ponce collapsed, while crops and cattle suffered major impacts. Due to the effects in Puerto Rico, the storm was compared to Hurricane Donna in 1960. On the Turks and Caicos Islands, almost every dwelling experienced some degree of damage, while the hurricane flattened over 250 homes owned by peasants. More than 400,000 bushels of salt were ruined. A total of 21 people died on the Turks and Caicos Islands. Meteorologist Ivan Ray Tannehill stated in 1938 that "gigantic" surf generated by this storm "swept out of existence" entire towns on Cuba's northern coast. Extreme damage to tobacco plantations, farms, homes, and buildings occurred in the four westernmost provinces, including in major cities. The Vuelta Abajo region alone reported the destruction of virtually all tobacco crops and more than 3,000 homes, leaving about 10,000 people homeless. In Havana, few public buildings escaped damage and massive trees felled, with some being blown several blocks away, while downed street lamps left most of the city dark. Waves capsized many barges and left the northern sections of Havana inundated and only accessible via boats. Damage in Cuba exceeded $1 million, while approximately 800 people died on the island. In Mexico, the storm produced heavy rainfall in the vicinity of Veracruz. Three vessels were beached, while a bark and schooner collided. Overall, the hurricane caused 921 fatalities.

=== Tropical Storm Five ===
- Tropical storm (SSHWS)
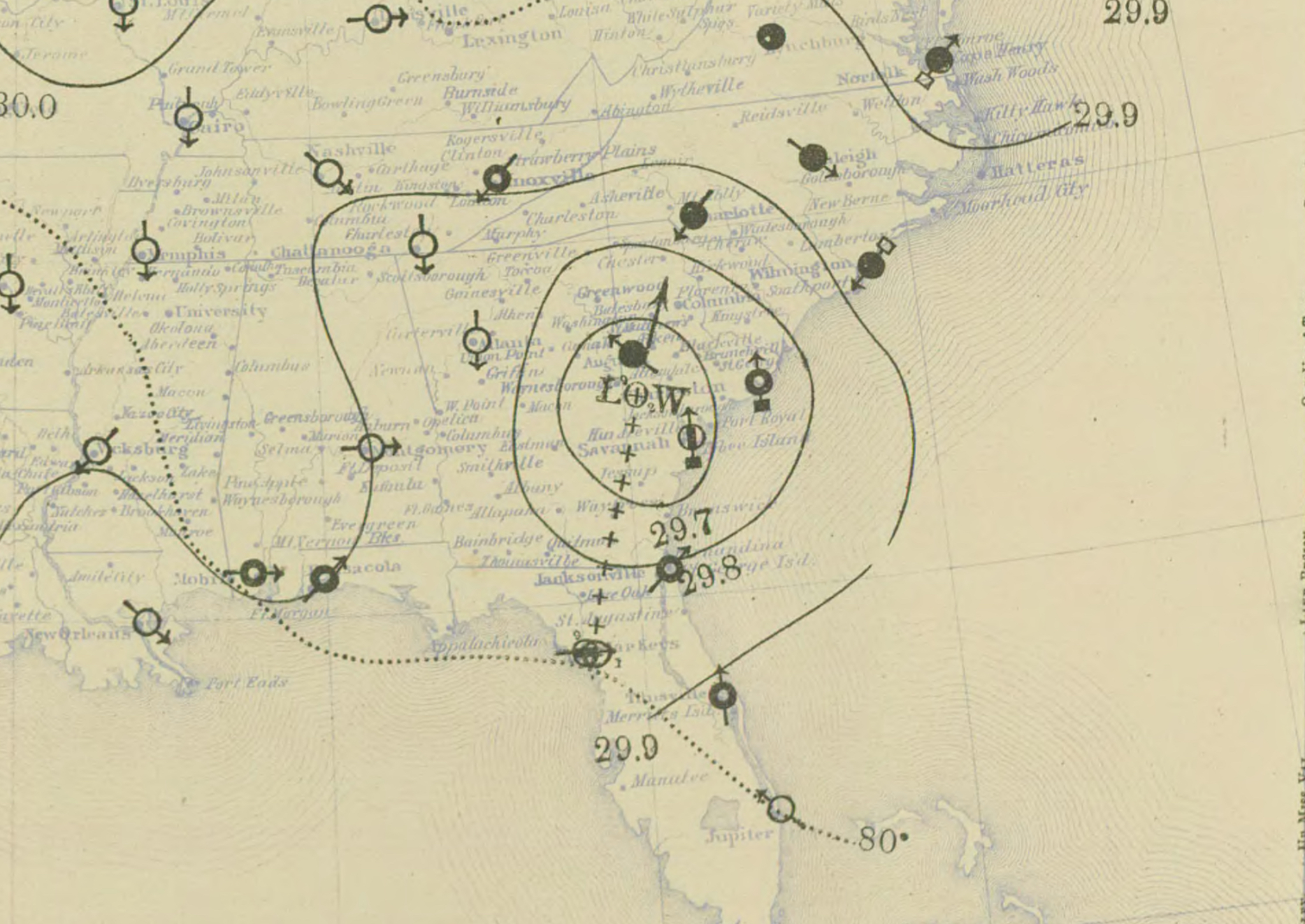
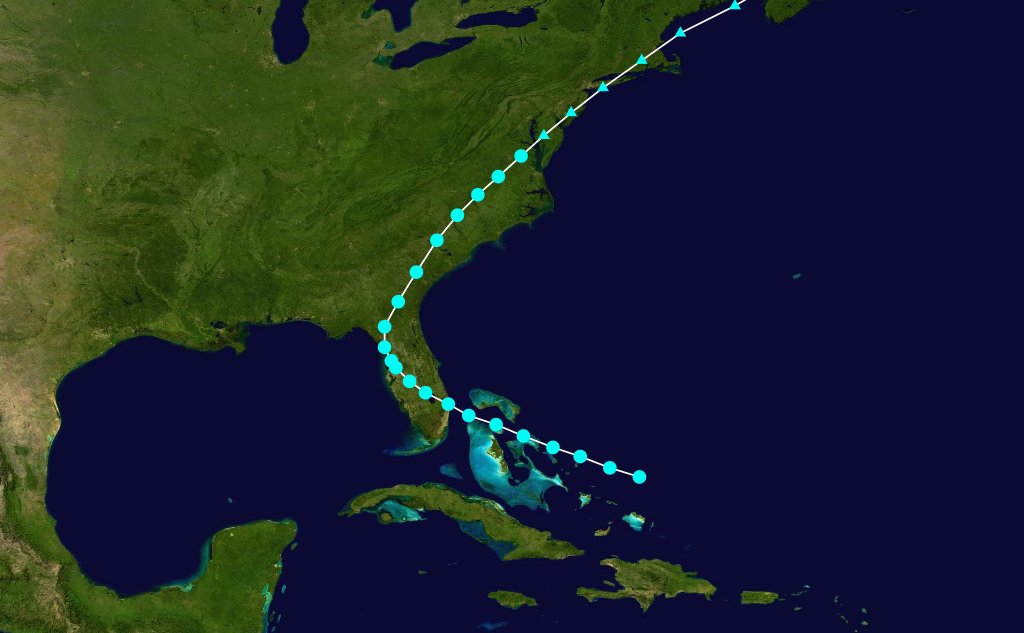
- Duration: September 6 – September 11
- Peak intensity: 60 mph (95 km/h) (1-min); 999 mbar (hPa)

Based on a 1993 reanalysis led by meteorologist C. J. Neumann, the official track begins on September 6 about 110 mi (175 km) north of Turks and Caicos Islands. Trekking west-northwestward, the system passed through the northern Bahamas on September 7. Around 00:00 UTC the next day, the system made landfall near present-day Palm Beach, Florida, with winds of 50 mph (85 km/h). After drifting while just north of Tampa, the cyclone turned northeastward. Despite the system moving over land, it peaked with winds of 60 mph (95 km/h) early on September 9 while passing near Cedar Key, which observed a barometric pressure of 999 mbar (29.5 inHg). The storm reached Maryland before becoming extratropical on September 11. Continuing northeastward, the remnants crossed the Northeastern United States and entered Atlantic Canada before dissipating over southern New Brunswick on the next day. Chenoweth proposed that this storm moved in a zigzag-type path over Florida and Georgia and later may have tracked far enough east to miss Long Island, New York, and instead strike Rhode Island.

Across the Southeastern United States, the storm deposited heavy rainfall from Florida through southern Virginia, including a peak total of 11.70 in (297 mm) in Greenwood, South Carolina. In Florida, a few locations observed sustained tropical storm-force winds, including 48 mph (75 km/h) in Titusville and 60 mph (95 km/h) in Cedar Key. According to a 1960 report by Gordon E. Dunn and Banner I. Miller, the cyclone caused "considerable damage at Micco." Precipitation in Virginia ended a four-month drought in the state's Southside region. However, floodwaters inundated many corn and tobacco fields. Farther east, the storm ruined crops and toppled some trees and buildings in Isle of Wight, Nansemond, and Southampton counties. The East Coast of the United States experienced gales as far north as Boston, Massachusetts.

=== Hurricane Six ===
- Category 1 hurricane (SSHWS)
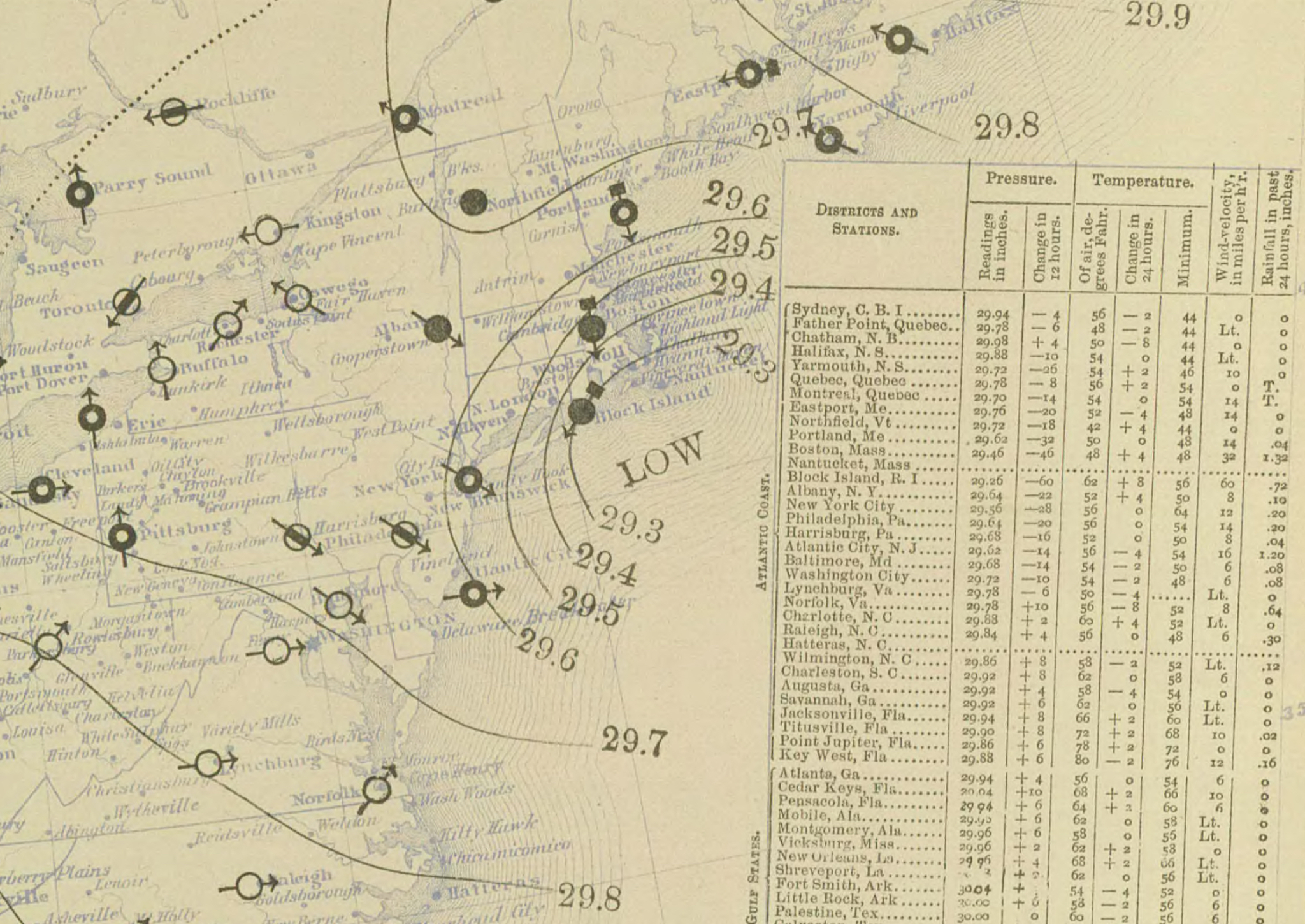
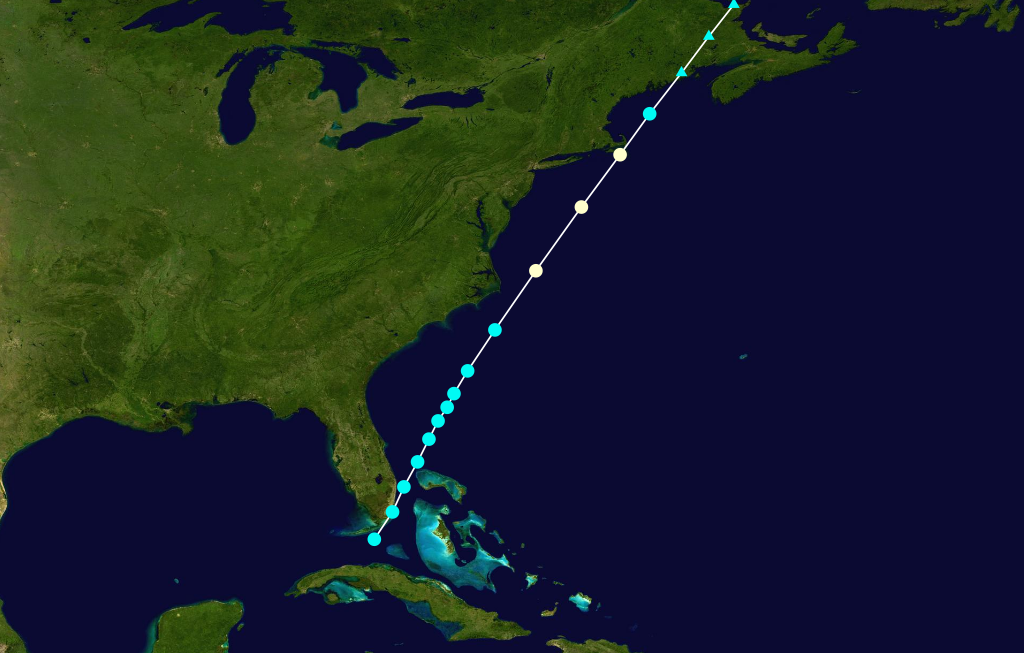
- Duration: September 23 – September 26
- Peak intensity: 80 mph (130 km/h) (1-min); 985 mbar (hPa)

The track for this storm begins about 30 mi (50 km) south of Marathon, Florida, on September 23, one day before ships first reported a cyclone near the state. Moving northeastward, the storm struck the northern Florida Keys shortly thereafter. By early September 26, the system intensified into a hurricane with sustained winds of 80 mph (130 km/h), based on Nantucket, Massachusetts, recording a barometric pressure of 985 mbar (29.1 inHg). Around 13:00 UTC, the hurricane made landfall near Chatham, Massachusetts, at that intensity. The system weakened to a tropical storm later on September 26 and then struck near Roque Bluffs, Maine, shortly before transitioning into an extratropical cyclone. On the following day, the extratropical remnants dissipated over eastern New Brunswick. Chenoweth proposed that this storm only existed as a subtropical cyclone on September 25 and early the next day.

Parts of coastal New England reported tropical storm-force winds, including sustained winds of 60 mph (95 km/h) at Block Island, Rhode Island; Boston, Massachusetts; and Eastport, Maine. Several yachts at a club in Providence, Rhode Island, suffered damage, including about $1,000 to the Stilo. A number of vessels also capsized or wrecked along the coasts of Massachusetts and Maine. On land in the former, the storm flooded some homes in Everett and cellars near the Highland branch railway and caused a washout along a railway between Sagamore and Sandwich. Winds downed many telegraph and telephone lines and toppled some trees or stripped many of their foliage in Boston. Heavy rainfalls left roads impassible in many places. However, damage in Boston overall was slight.

=== Hurricane Seven ===
- Category 2 hurricane (SSHWS)
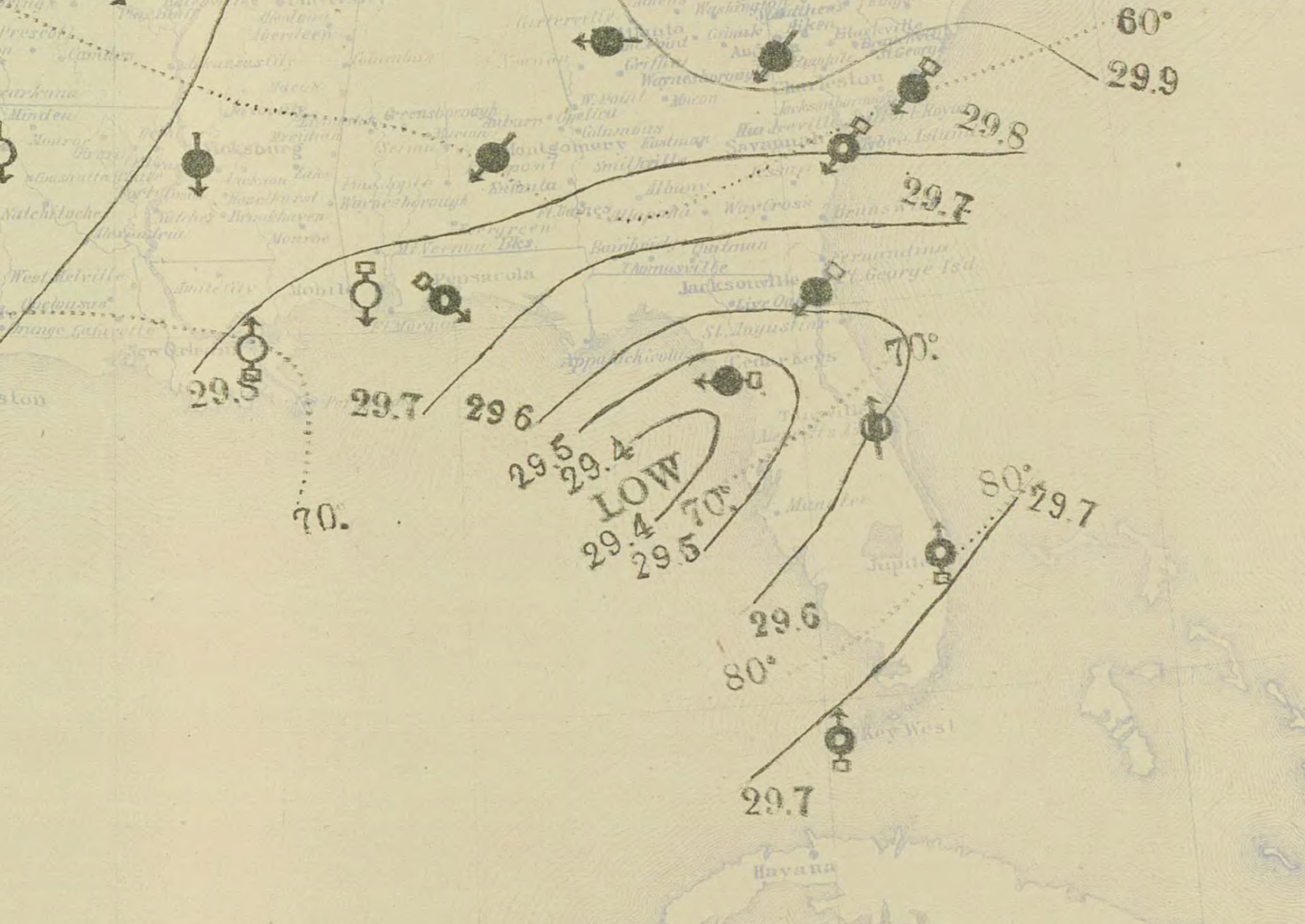
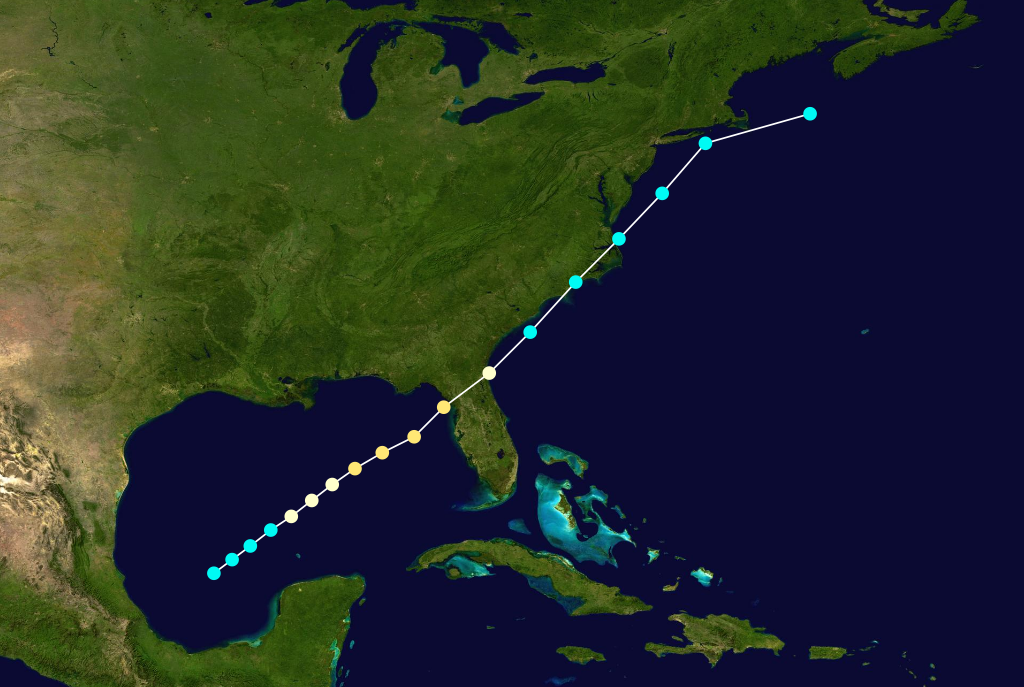
- Duration: October 8 – October 12
- Peak intensity: 110 mph (175 km/h) (1-min); 970 mbar (hPa)

A tropical storm existed over the southwestern Gulf of Mexico on October 8, according to Tannehill's 1938 reanalysis. By the following day, the system strengthened into a hurricane and then reached Category 2 status on October 10. The hurricane then reached peak intensity early on October 11 with winds of 110 mph (175 km/h) and a minimum pressure of 970 mbar (29 inHg) around the time it struck just north of Cedar Key, Florida, based on local storm surge observations. In less than six hours after landfall, the cyclone traversed the Florida peninsula and emerged into the Atlantic near Jacksonville, albeit as a much weaker storm. Continuing to weaken after reaching the Atlantic, the system fell to tropical storm intensity prior to making another landfall near present-day Oak Island, North Carolina. The storm re-emerged into the Atlantic east of Elizabeth City early on October 12 and continued northeastward until curving east-northeastward near the eastern tip of Long Island, New York. Several hours later, the system was last noted near the Gulf of Maine. The reanalysis study by Chenoweth suggested that this cyclone clipped the Yucatán Peninsula before entering the Gulf of Mexico. Later, the system does not emerge into the Atlantic and instead becomes extratropical near Beaufort, South Carolina, on October 11.

Cedar Key, Florida, observed sustained wind speeds as high as 75 mph (120 km/h). Tides there reportedly rose by 9 ft (2.7 m) in 30 minutes, flooding low-lying streets and forcing many people to evacuate their homes. Damage on Cedar Key was estimated at $5,000, while nine people drowned. Although downtown Jacksonville only reported sustained winds of 38 mph (61 km/h), the storm destroyed the Beach House Hotel on nearby Fort George Island. Several locations in North Florida and South Georgia reported rainfall amounts up to 2 in (51 mm). Sustained winds up to 50 mph (80 km/h) in Savannah, Georgia, caused the streets to be littered with tree branches and downed some electrical wires. In North Carolina, the storm produced 5-minute sustained winds of 60 mph (95 km/h) at Wilmington. Farther north, at least one location in New England reported tropical storm-force winds – 52 mph (84 km/h) on Block Island, Rhode Island.

=== Tropical Storm Eight ===
- Tropical storm (SSHWS)
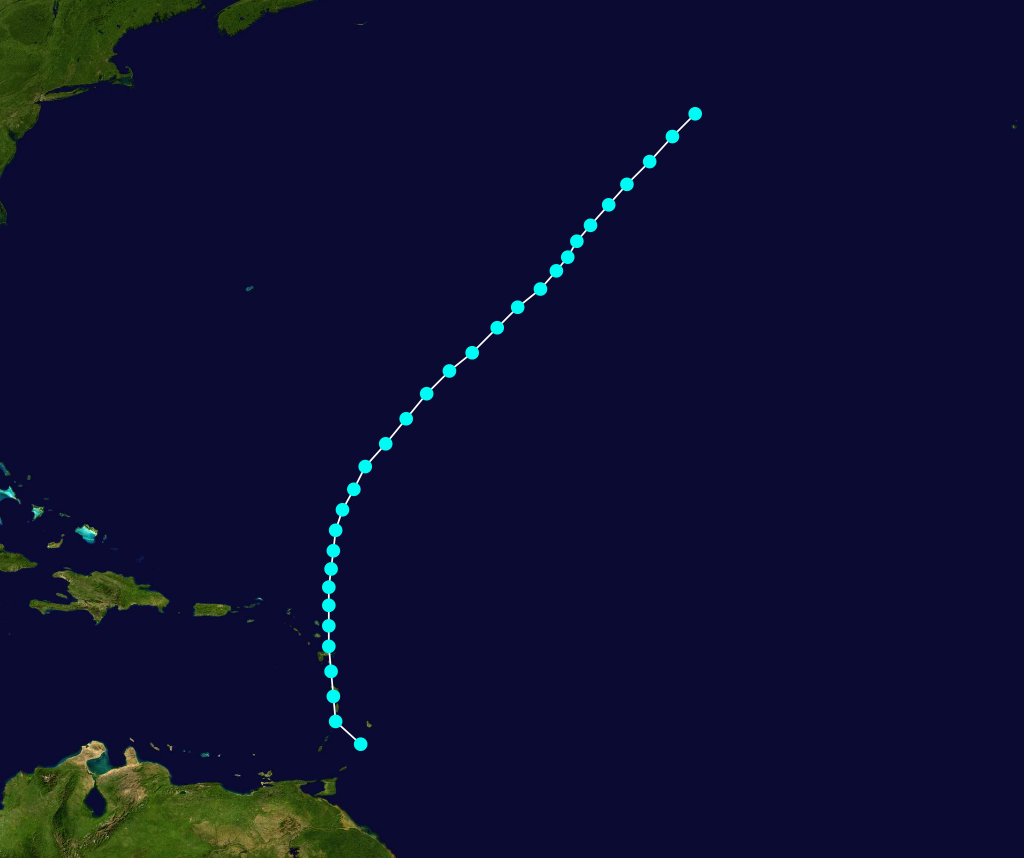
- Duration: November 1 – November 8
- Peak intensity: 60 mph (95 km/h) (1-min);

Based on the 1938 reanalysis by Tannehill, this storm was first detected about halfway between Barbados and Tobago on November 1. After initially moving northwestward, the storm turned northward, striking or passing near Saint Lucia, Martinique, Dominica, and Guadeloupe throughout that day and into November 2. Two days later, the cyclone turned northeastward while located north of the Leeward Islands and peaked with maximum sustained winds of 60 mph (95 km/h). The storm was last noted late on November 8 roughly 600 mi (965 km) southeast of Cape Race, Newfoundland, due to likely being absorbed by an extratropical system. Chenoweth shifted the track significantly eastward, with the storm not striking the Lesser Antilles as it tracked northwestward from October 29 to November 4 and then northeastward until becoming extratropical on November 7.

Although the storm passed through the Lesser Antilles between November 1 and November 2, only Martinique reported any noteworthy impacts. Heavy rains on the island overflowed rivers and caused rockslides that blocked or damaged some roads. Large waves generated by the storm at Saint-Pierre harbor damaged two barges.

=== Hurricane Nine ===
- Category 2 hurricane (SSHWS)
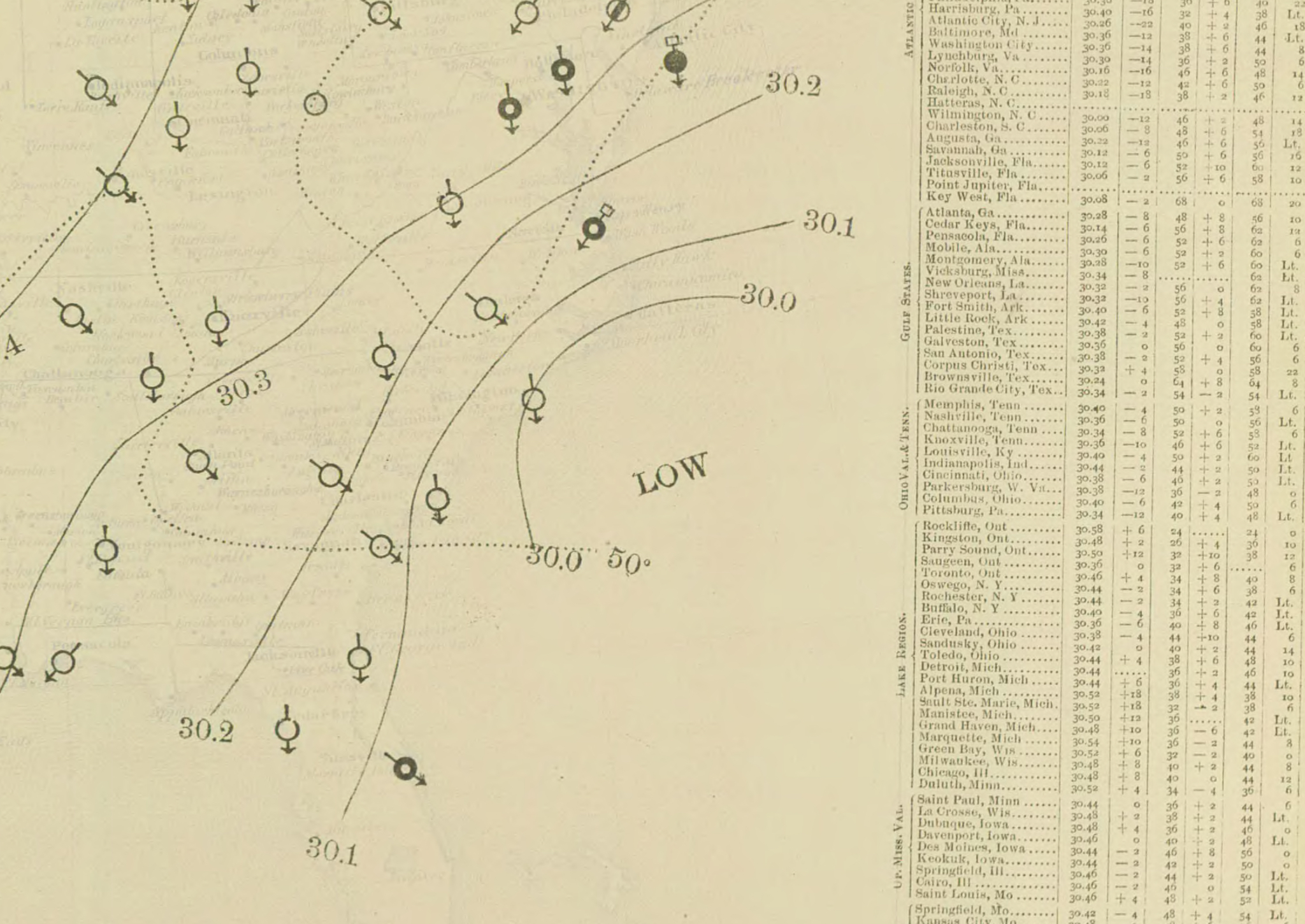
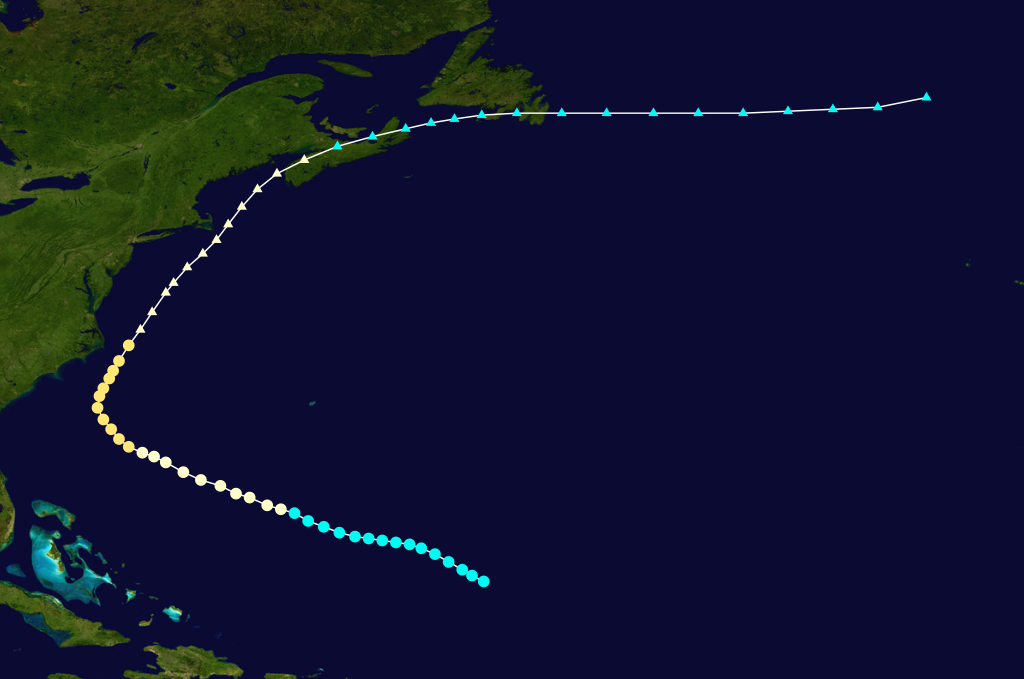
- Duration: November 17 – November 25
- Peak intensity: 100 mph (155 km/h) (1-min); ≤982 mbar (hPa)

The steamships Ascania and Mozart first encountered a tropical storm on November 17 to the northeast of the Lesser Antilles. Moving generally west-northwestward for about a week, the cyclone intensified into a hurricane by late on November 20, before reaching Category 2 status on November 23. The storm then curved northeastward on the next day and remained just offshore North Carolina. A schooner known as the Morancy recorded a barometric pressure of 982 mbar (29.0 inHg) on November 25, the lowest associated with the storm when it was a tropical cyclone. However, several hours later, the system became extratropical about 115 mi (185 km) east of Kitty Hawk, North Carolina. The extratropical cyclone continued northeastward, striking Nova Scotia at hurricane-equivalent intensity on November 28 and then turning east-northeastward, crossing Newfoundland on November 30. By December 2, the extratropical storm was last noted well north of the Azores. Chenoweth's reanalysis study argued that the storm turned sharply eastward on November 20 while south of Bermuda, remaining far from the East Coast of the United States. The storm then curved northeastward on November 22 and was last noted on the next day.

The hurricane and its extratropical remnants produced high winds across the East Coast of the United States from North Carolina northward. In Virginia, Norfolk and Cape Henry recorded 5-minute sustained wind speeds of 50 mph (80 km/h) and 72 mph (116 km/h), respectively, downing telegraph wires in the former. With cold air enveloping the storm as it underwent extratropical transition, snow fell across parts of Virginia and Washington, D.C. The Boston Daily Globe described the storm as "twin brother of the March blizzard" in New Jersey and New York due to rain, sleet, snow, and winds downing many telegraph and telephone wires and impacting shipping. The system produced sustained winds in New England as high as 84 mph (135 km/h) at Block Island, Rhode Island. In Massachusetts, the storm downed many trees and flooded basements in the suburbs of Boston. A few towns such as Braintree, Gloucester, and Quincy reported structural damage and downed communications lines. One person died in South Braintree after winds felled a signal mast. Offshore, maritime incidents related to the storm drowned at least 15 people. Much of Nova Scotia experienced severe gales, but no major damage.

=== Other storms ===
Chenoweth proposed six other storms not currently listed in HURDAT. The first such system developed in the west-central Gulf of Mexico. As a minimal tropical storm moving northeastward, the cyclone brushed far southeastern tip of Louisiana, moved ashore in Alabama, crossed the Florida Panhandle, and re-entered Alabama before dissipating on June 28. Another unofficial storm developed just north of Trinidad on August 19. Moving generally west-northwestward, the system struck the Yucatán Peninsula as a tropical storm on August 24 and dissipated hours later. The third of Chenoweth's proposed storms developed just west of the Capo Verde Islands on September 5. Trekking parabolically across the eastern Atlantic, the storm crossed through the Azores between Terceira Island and São Miguel Island on September 12, shortly before becoming extratropical. Chenoweth first detected another cyclone over the east-central Atlantic on September 16. Heading northeastward for most of its duration, the system transitioned into an extratropical cyclone just northwest of the westernmost islands of the Azores on September 20. Another storm formed on October 1 over the eastern Caribbean. The storm moved northwestward, clipping far eastern Puerto Rico on the next day. Turned northeastward on October 6, the cyclone passed just south of Bermuda on October 8 before being last tracked by Chenoweth several hours later. On October 13, Chenoweth's final proposed system developed as a subtropical storm southwest of the Azores. After trekking east-southeastward, the storm abruptly turned southward, but then curved northeastward on October 16. The system then became extratropical on October 18 about halfway between the Azores and Madeira Island.

== Season effects ==
This is a table of all of the known storms that formed in the 1888 Atlantic hurricane season. It includes their duration, landfall, damages, and death totals. Deaths in parentheses are additional and indirect (an example of an indirect death would be a traffic accident), but were still related to that storm. Damage and deaths include totals while the storm was extratropical, a wave, or a low, and all of the damage figures are in 1888 USD.

Saffir–Simpson scale
TD	TS	C1	C2	C3	C4	C5

1888 North Atlantic tropical cyclone season statistics
Storm name	Dates active	Storm category at peak intensity	Max 1-min wind mph (km/h)	Min. press. (mbar)	Areas affected	Damage (US$)	Deaths	Ref(s).
One	June 16–18	Category 1 hurricane	80 (130)	985	Texas	Unknown	None	
Two	July 4–6	Tropical storm	60 (95)	≤1008	Texas	Unknown	Unknown	
Three	August 14–22	Category 3 hurricane	125 (205)	945	Bahamas, Eastern United States (Florida and Louisiana)	Unknown	12	
Four	August 31 – September 8	Category 3 hurricane	125 (205)	≤972	Puerto Rico, Turks and Caicos Islands, Bahamas, Greater Antilles (Cuba), Mexico (Quintana Roo and Veracruz)	>$1 million	921	
Five	September 6–11	Tropical storm	60 (95)	999	East Coast of the United States (Florida)	Unknown	None	
Six	September 23–26	Category 1 hurricane	80 (130)	986	East Coast of the United States (Florida, Massachusetts, Maine), Atlantic Canada	>$1,000	None	
Seven	October 8–12	Category 2 hurricane	110 (175)	970	East Coast of the United States (Florida, North Carolina)	>$5,000	9	
Eight	November 1 – November 8	Tropical storm	60 (95)	Unknown	Lesser Antilles	Unknown	None	
Nine	November 17–25	Category 2 hurricane	100 (155)	≤982	East Coast of the United States, Atlantic Canada	Unknown	16	
Season aggregates
9 systems	June 16 – November 25		125 (205)	945		>$1 million	958	

== See also ==
- Atlantic hurricane reanalysis project
- Tropical cyclone observation

== Bibliography ==
- Barnes, Jay (1998), Florida's Hurricane History, Chapel Hill Press, ISBN 978-0-8078-4748-0
- Grazulis, Thomas P. (1993), Significant Tornadoes 1680–1991: A Chronology and Analysis of Events, The Tornado Project of Environmental Films, ISBN 1-879362-03-1
- Landsea, Christopher W. (2004), "The Atlantic hurricane database re-analysis project: Documentation for the 1851–1910 alterations and additions to the HURDAT database", in Murname, Richard J.; Liu, Kam-biu (eds.), Hurricanes and Typhoons: Past, Present and Future, New York City, New York: Columbia University Press, p. 195, ISBN 0-231-12388-4
