= 1918 Atlantic hurricane season =

- Season summary map

Seasonal boundaries
- First system formed: June 19, 1918
- Last system dissipated: October 19, 1918

Strongest storm
- Name: "Louisiana"
  - Maximum winds: 120 mph (195 km/h) (1-minute sustained)
  - Lowest pressure: 955 mbar (hPa; 28.2 inHg)

Seasonal statistics
- Total depressions: 10
- Total storms: 6
- Hurricanes: 4
- Major hurricanes (Cat. 3+): 1
- Total fatalities: 55
- Total damage: $5 million (1918 USD)

Related articles
- 1910–19 Pacific hurricane seasons; 1902-19 Pacific typhoon seasons; 1910s North Indian Ocean cyclone seasons

The 1918 Atlantic hurricane season was an inactive season, with a total of six tropical storms developing, four of which intensified into hurricanes. Two of the season's hurricanes made Landfall in the United States, and one became a major hurricane, which is Category 3 or higher on the modern-day Saffir–Simpson scale. Additionally, there were four suspected tropical depressions, including one that began the season on June 19 and one that ended the season when it dissipated on October 19. The early 20th century lacked modern forecasting and documentation, and thus, the hurricane database from these years may be incomplete. Four previously unknown tropical cyclones were identified using records, including historical weather maps and ship reports, while information on the known storms was amended.

The strongest system of the season was the second tropical cyclone, which peaked as a Category 3 hurricane. The storm devastated southwestern Louisiana in early August, especially Cameron Parish, leaving 34 fatalities and approximately $5 million (1918 USD) in damage. (Note: All damage figures are 1918 USD unless otherwise noted) In late August, the season's third tropical storm damaged portions of coastal North Carolina, causing up to $15,000 in damage. Although the fifth tropical storm or its extratropical remnants caused only minor impacts on land in Bermuda and Atlantic Canada, 21 people drowned after two ships were caught in the storm.

The season's activity was reflected with an accumulated cyclone energy (ACE) rating of 40, below the 1911–1920 average of 58.7. ACE is a metric used to express the energy used by a tropical cyclone during its lifetime. Therefore, a storm with a longer duration will have high values of ACE. It is only calculated at six-hour increments in which specific tropical and subtropical systems are either at or above sustained wind speeds of 39 mph (63 km/h), which is the threshold for tropical storm intensity. Thus, tropical depressions are not included here.

== Systems ==
=== Hurricane One ===
- Category 3 hurricane (SSHWS)
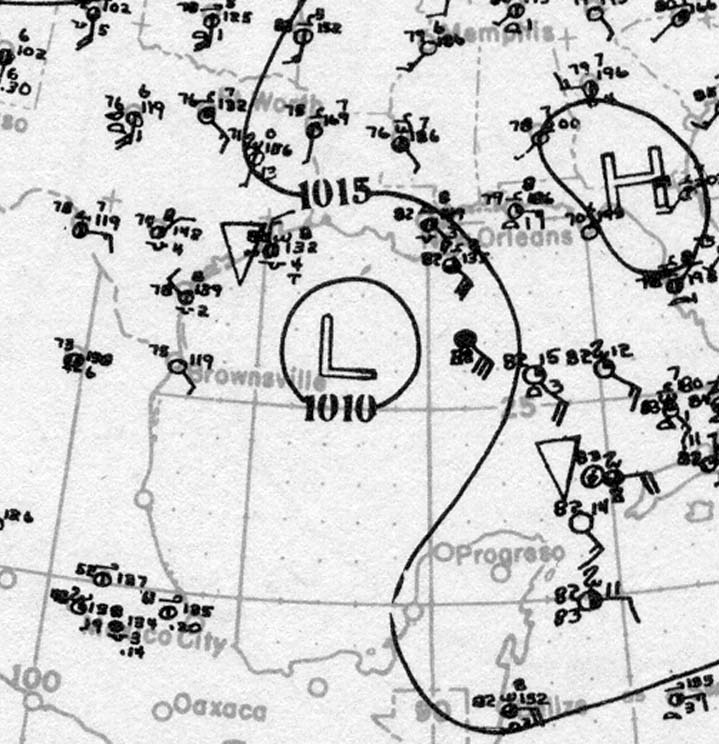
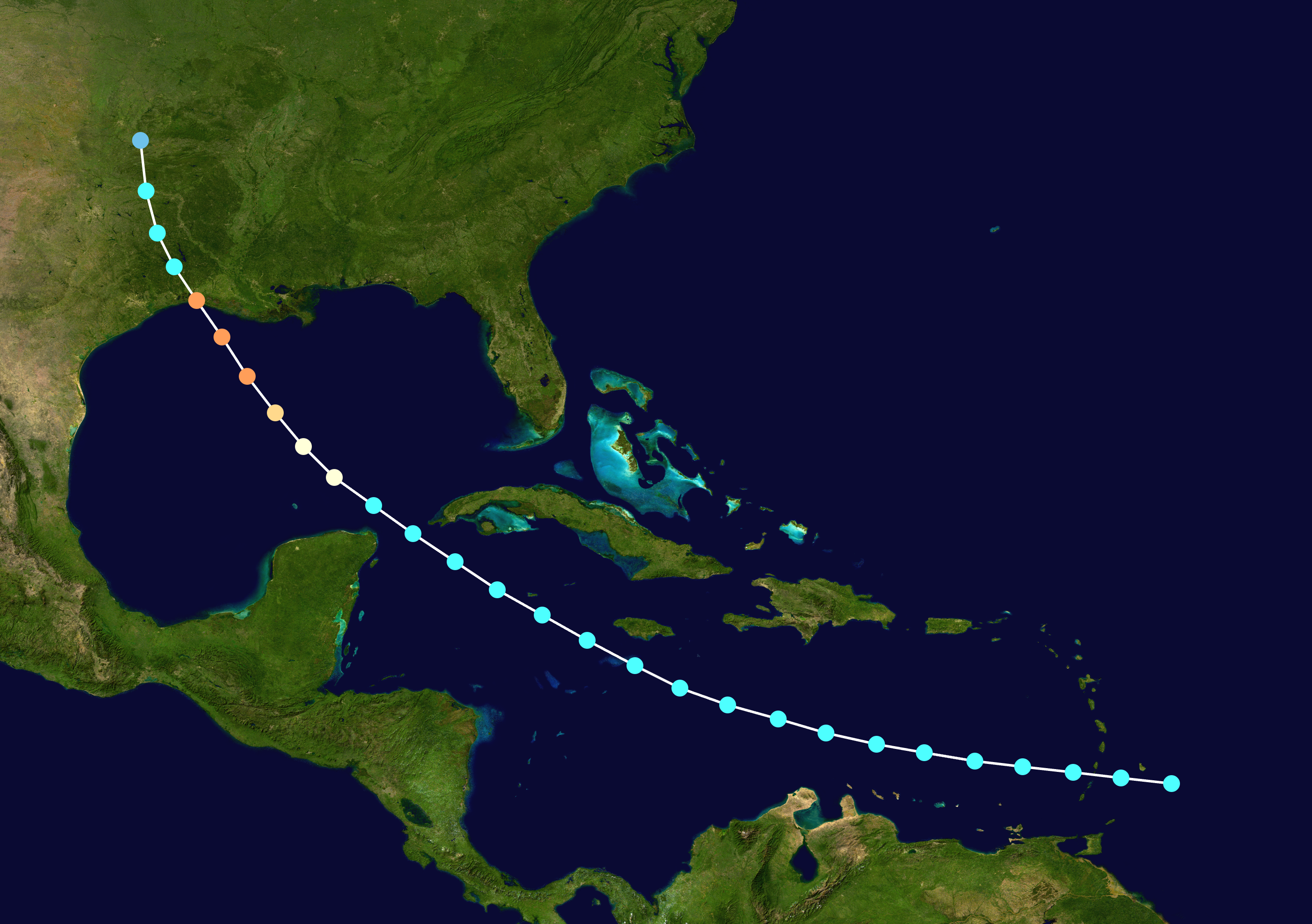
- Duration: August 1 – August 7
- Peak intensity: 120 mph (195 km/h) (1-min); 955 mbar (hPa)

A tropical storm was first noted in cable reports from Bridgetown, Barbados, on August 1. Moving west-northwestward, the storm soon passed through the Grenadines before entering the Caribbean Sea. The cyclone gradually curved northwestward over the Caribbean and strengthened slowly. While approaching the Yucatán Channel late on August 4, the system began to intensify significantly. After reaching the Gulf of Mexico, the storm strengthened into a Category 1 hurricane on the modern day Saffir–Simpson scale at 12:00 UTC on August 5. On the following day, the cyclone became a major hurricane and peaked as a Category 3 hurricane with maximum sustained winds of 120 mph (195 km/h) and a minimum barometric pressure of 955 millibars (28.2 inHg). Around 18:00 UTC on August 6, the hurricane made landfall near Cameron, Louisiana. The system quickly weakened after moving inland, dissipating over Oklahoma about 24 hours later.

Along the coast of Louisiana, storm surge swept away homes in Creole and Grand Chenier. Strong winds were observed in southwestern Louisiana, with gusts up to 125 mph (201 km/h) at Sulphur. Very few businesses in the town remained standing, with the Union Sulphur Mines suffering $3 million in damage. Three pilots were killed at Gerstner Field near Holmwood, while 7 hangars and 96 airplanes were destroyed. Only its Big Lake Gunnery School survived, though it required extensive repairs. In Lake Charles, debris from destroyed homes and downed electrical wires left nearly all streets impassable. Several buildings were also severely damaged or destroyed, including a synagogue, two churches, an oil corporation building, and a number of sawmills. In the Goosport Milling District, fires broke out, causing additional damage. Most of the buildings in DeQuincy and Westlake were leveled, with the latter described as "a scene of desolation." Overall, there were 34 deaths and $5 million in damage in Louisiana.

=== Hurricane Two ===
- Category 2 hurricane (SSHWS)
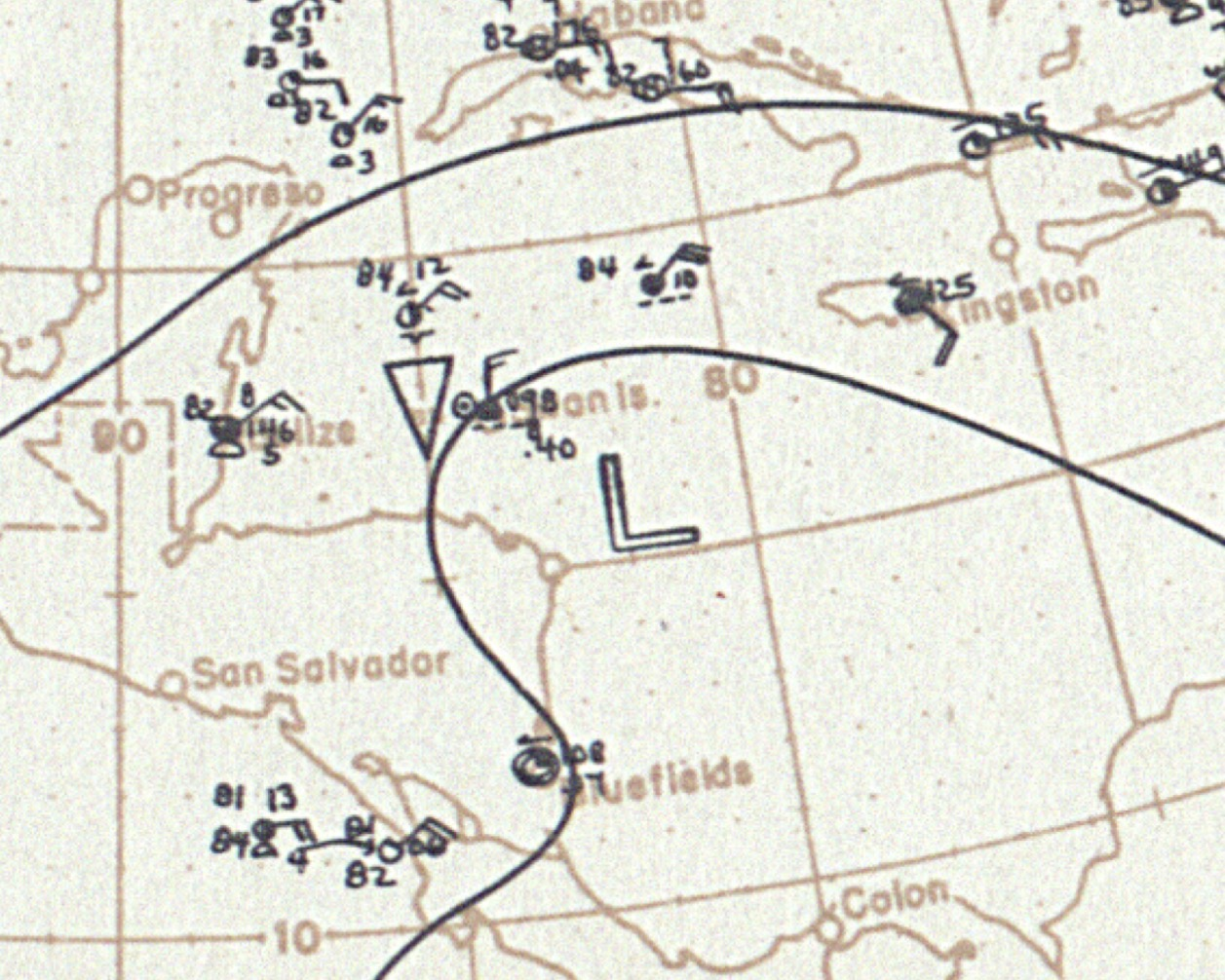
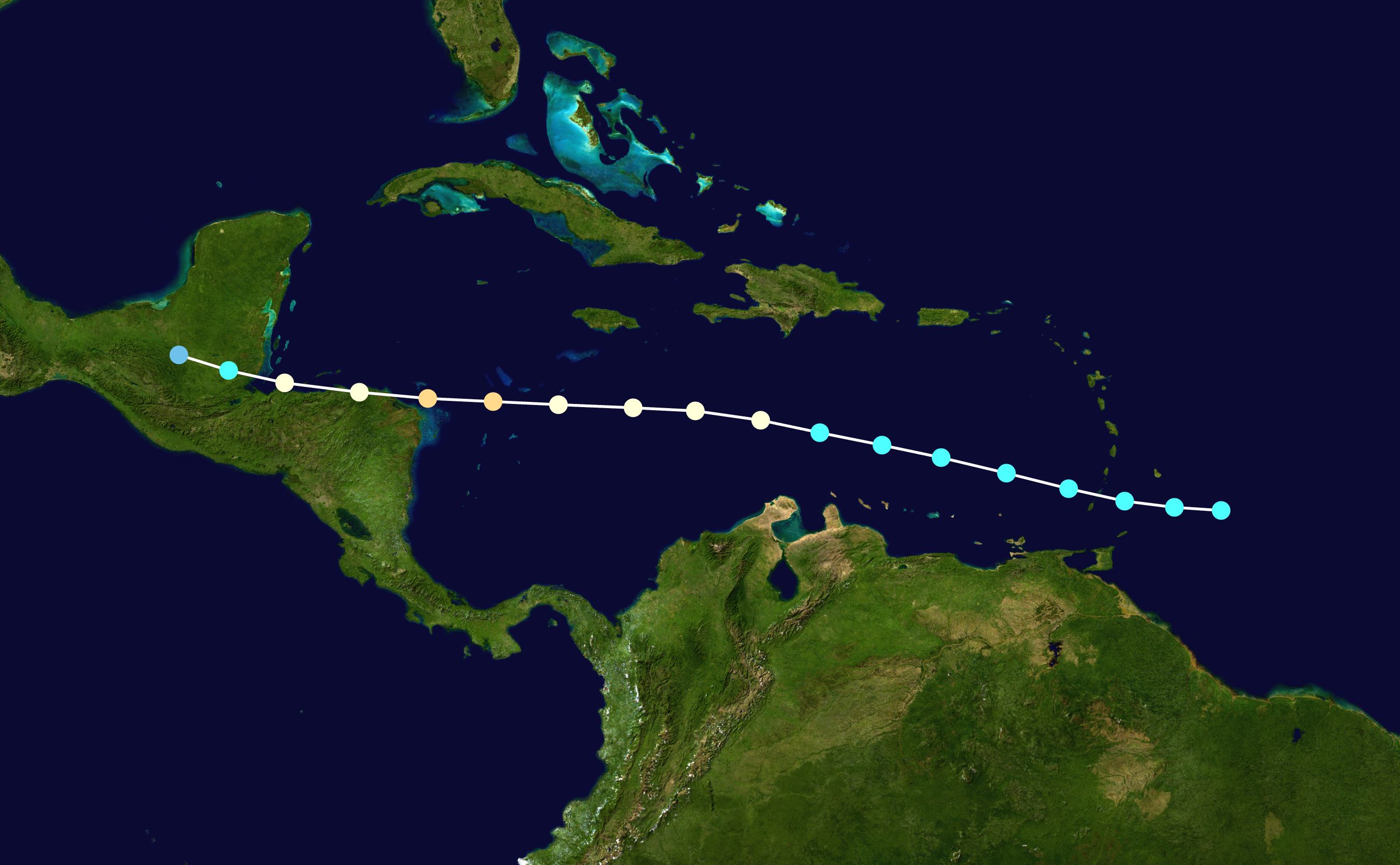
- Duration: August 22 – August 26
- Peak intensity: 105 mph (165 km/h) (1-min); 968 mbar (hPa)

A tropical wave developed into the season's third tropical storm just east of the Windward Islands on August 22. While the storm passed south of Barbados, sustained winds reached 48 mph (77 km/h) from the southeast. Late on August 22, the cyclone passed through the Grenadines and entered the Caribbean. The system intensified into Category 1 hurricane while south of Haiti early on August 24 and became a Category 2 hurricane over the western Caribbean about 24 hours later. On August 25, the hurricane peaked with maximum sustained winds of 105 mph (165 km/h) and a minimum barometric pressure of 968 mbar (28.6 inHg). Late on August 25, the hurricane made landfall near Brus Laguna, Honduras. Early the following day, the storm briefly re-emerged into the Caribbean before making landfall near Monkey River Town, Belize. The cyclone quickly weakened over land and dissipated by 12:00 UTC on August 26. Due to lack of wind observations in Honduras and Belize, it is possible that the storm was below hurricane intensity during those landfalls.

=== Hurricane Three ===
- Category 1 hurricane (SSHWS)
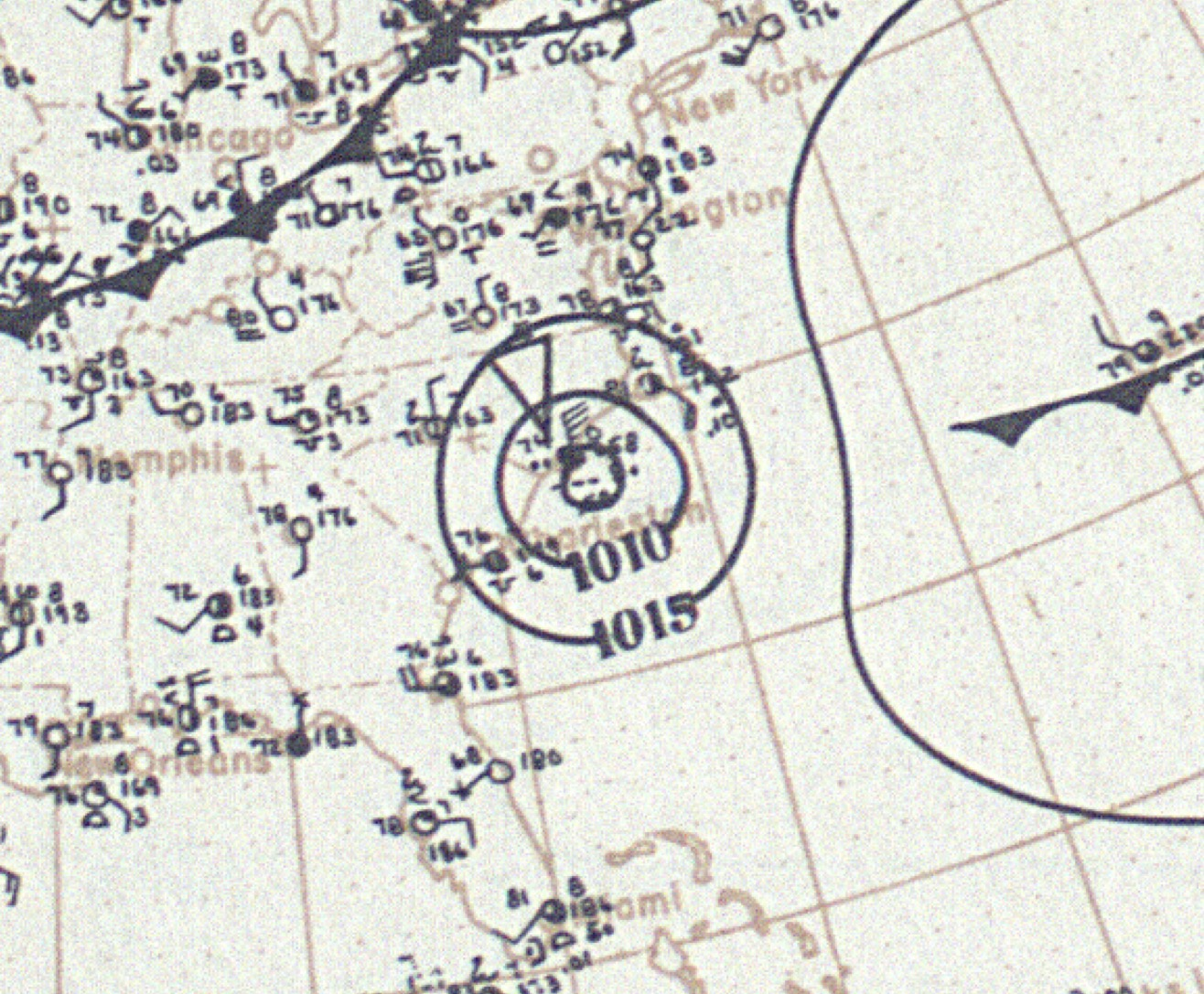
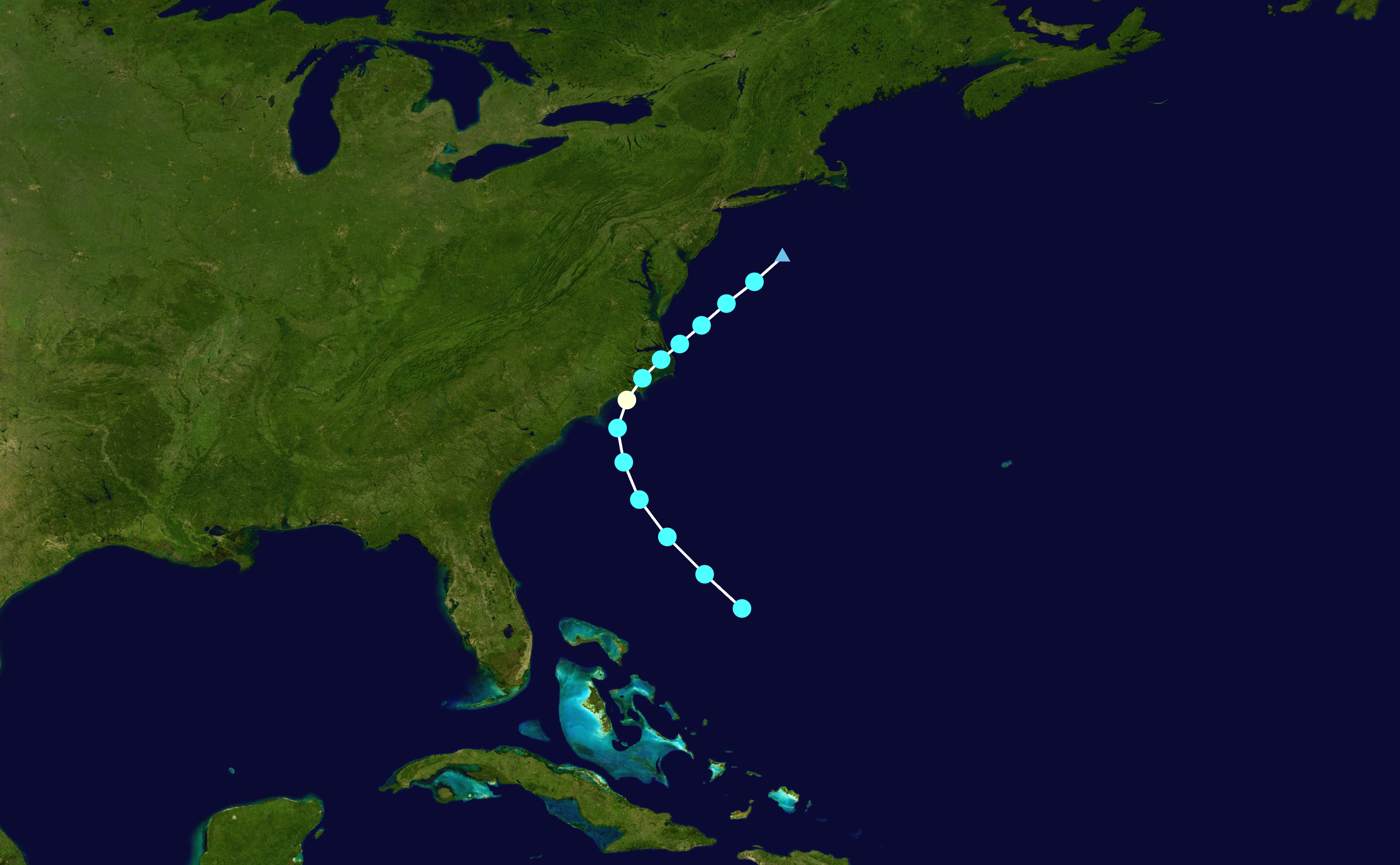
- Duration: August 23 – August 26
- Peak intensity: 75 mph (120 km/h) (1-min); 988 mbar (hPa)

A low-pressure area developed into a tropical storm by 06:00 UTC on August 23, while located about 240 mi (390 km) east-northeast of the northern Bahamas. The storm steadily strengthened while moving northwestward, before curving to the north-northwest. Around 18:00 UTC on August 24, the cyclone intensified into Category 1 hurricane, peaking with maximum sustained winds of 75 mph (120 km/h). The storm, moving northeastward, made landfall near Emerald Isle, North Carolina, with an estimated barometric pressure of 988 mbar (29.2 inHg), the lowest pressure in relation to the storm. While moving across coastal North Carolina, the cyclone weakened to a tropical storm early on August 25, several hours before re-emerging into the Atlantic. The system continued weakening before merging with a frontal system about 125 mi (200 km) east-southeast of New Jersey at 12:00 UTC on August 26.

Abnormally high tides and strong winds left some damage to crops, fencing, and buildings, especially at Atlantic, Ocracoke, and Harkers Island. Dozens of small boats were smashed into pieces along the beaches. A number of people were injured by airborne timbers while attempting to protect their property. It was estimated that damage did not exceed $15,000.

=== Tropical Storm Four ===
- Tropical storm (SSHWS)
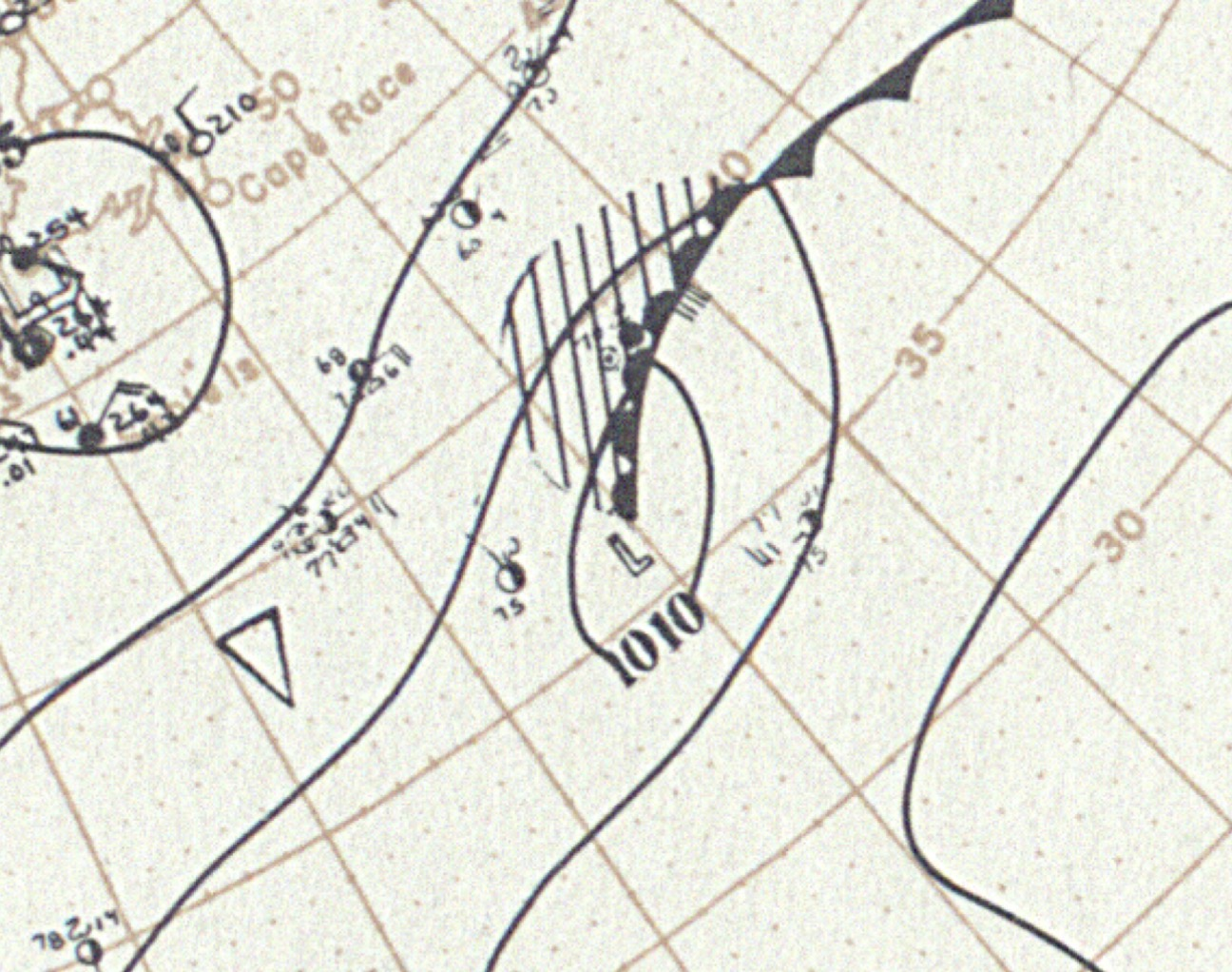
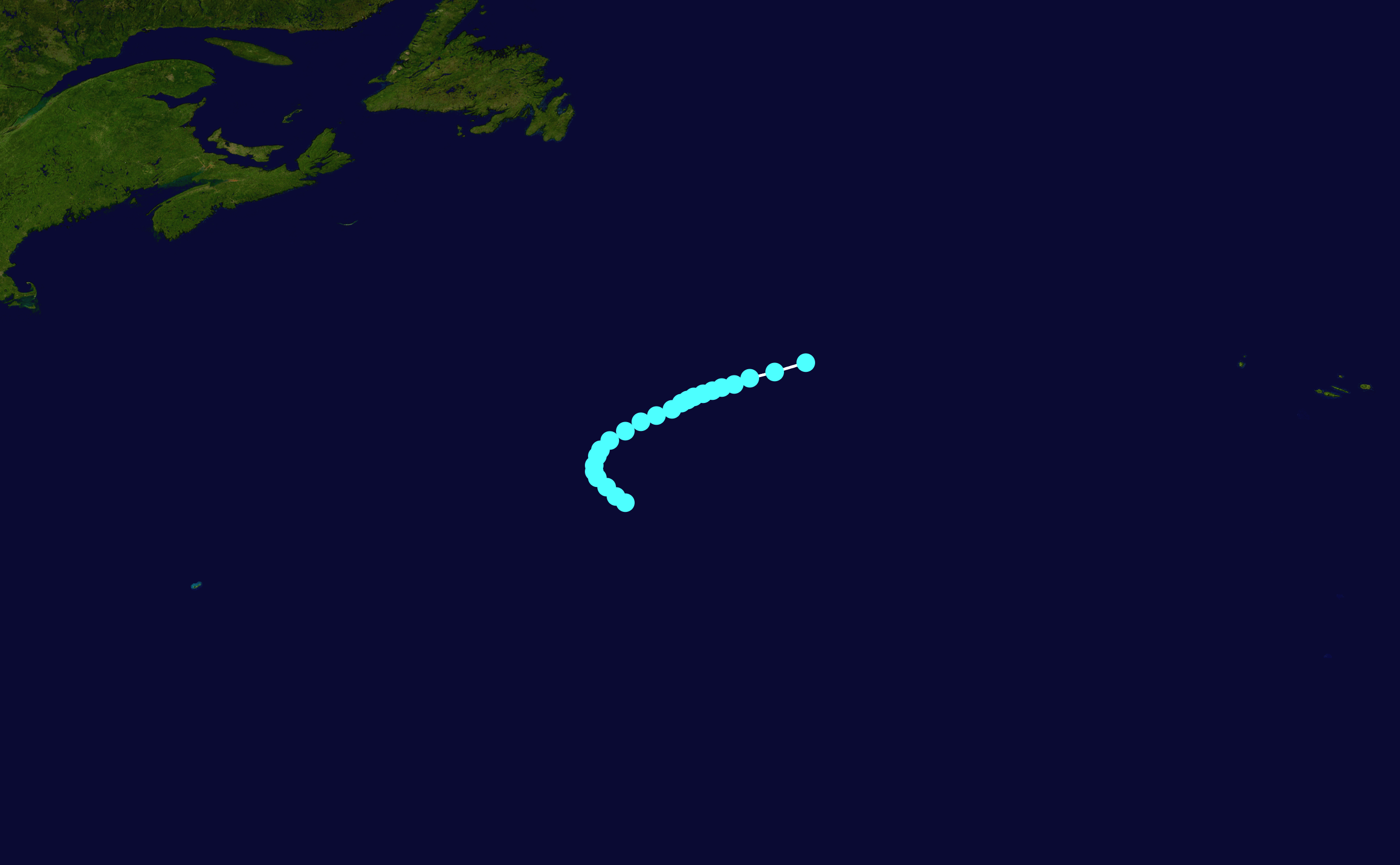
- Duration: August 31 – September 6
- Peak intensity: 70 mph (110 km/h) (1-min); <992 mbar (hPa)

A low-pressure area of non-tropical origins developed into a tropical storm about 815 mi (1,310 km) east-northeast of Bermuda on August 31. The storm initially moved northwestward, before curving east-northeastward late on September 1. Over the next few days, the cyclone intensified slowly. Early on September 4, the system peaked with maximum sustained winds of 70 mph (110 km/h) and a minimum barometric pressure of 992 mbar (29.3 inHg). The storm began weakening early on September 5 and was absorbed by a frontal boundary about 640 mi (1,030 km) southeast of Newfoundland at 00:00 UTC on September 6. This storm was first added to the Atlantic hurricane database in 2008.

=== Hurricane Five ===
- Category 2 hurricane (SSHWS)
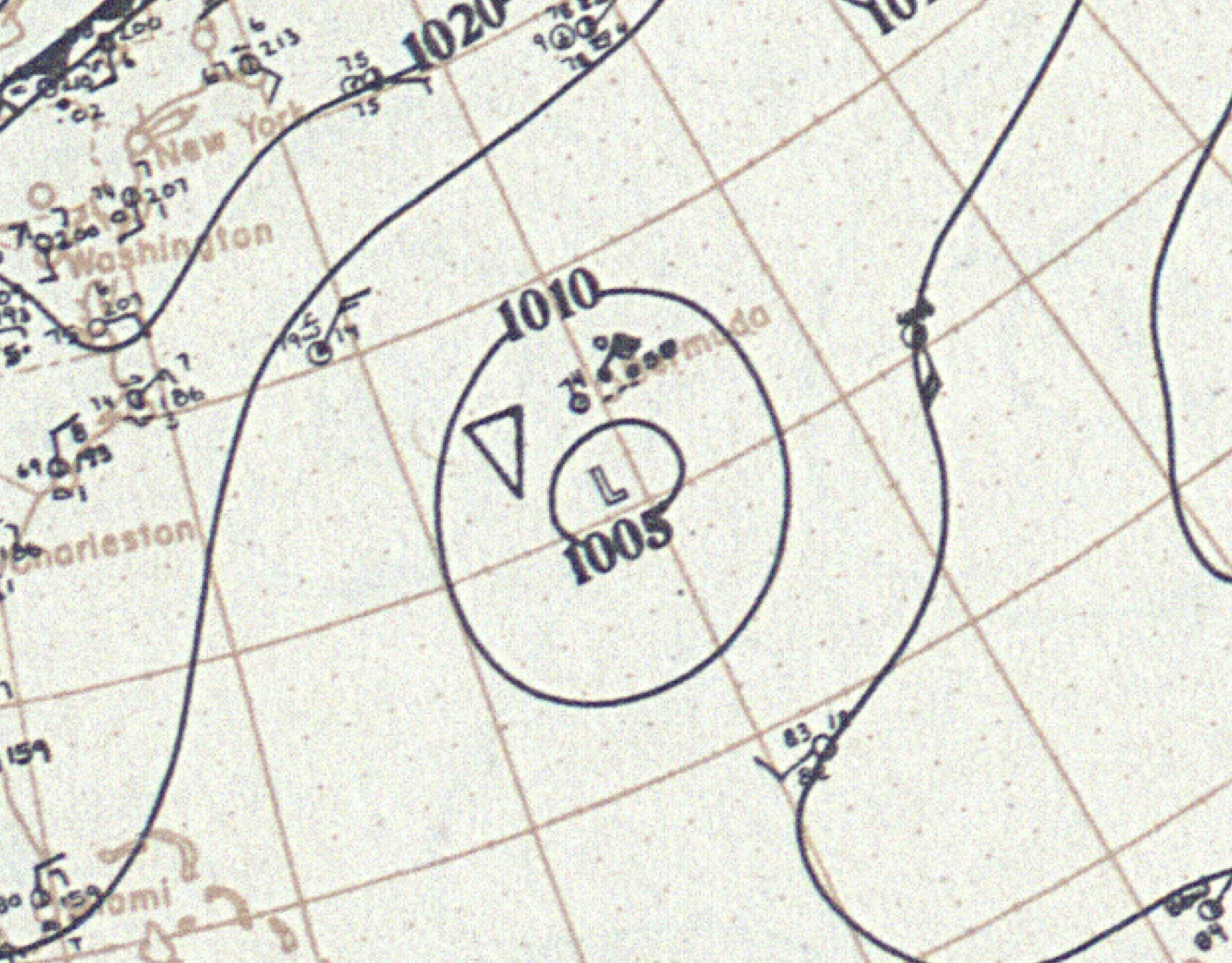
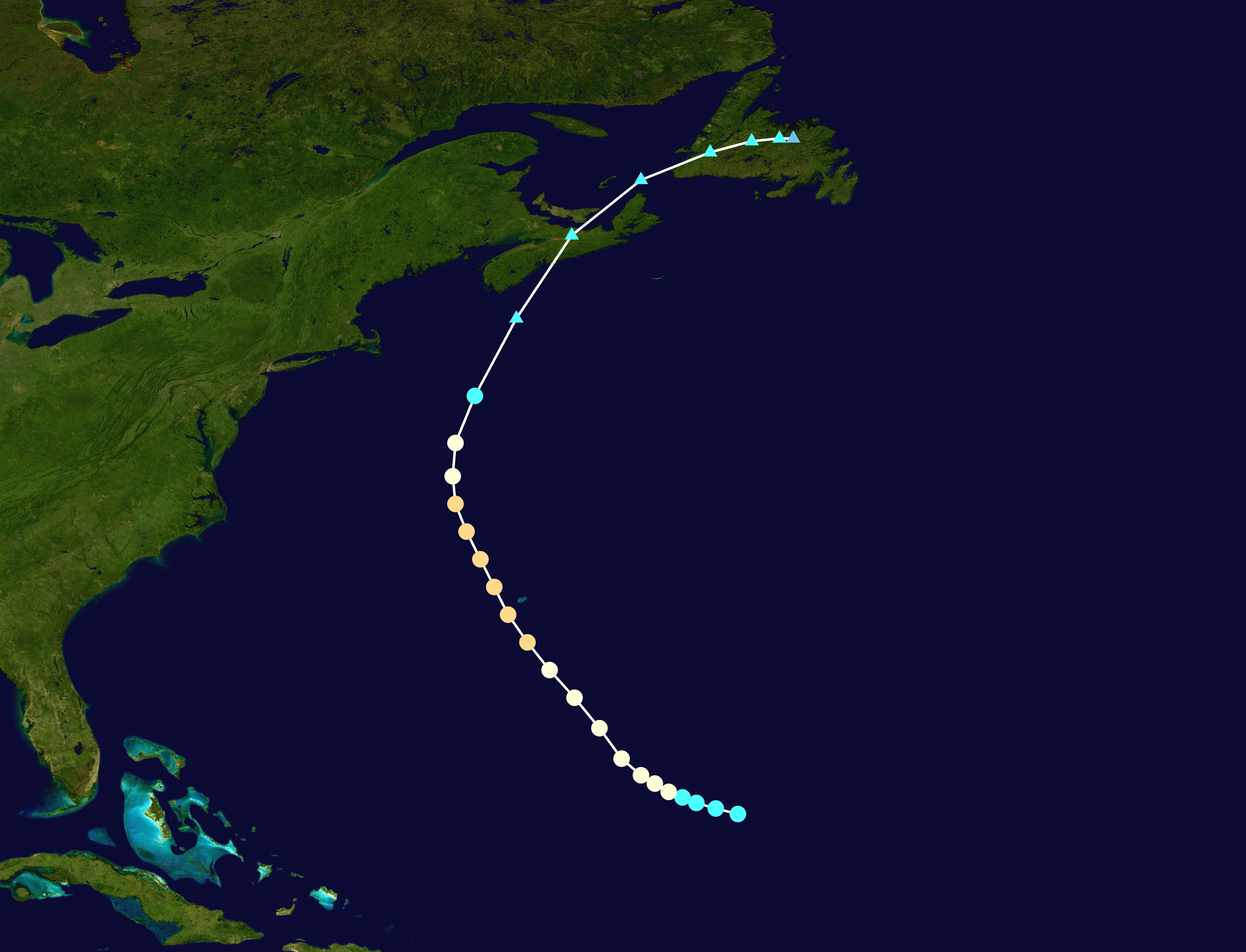
- Duration: September 2 – September 6
- Peak intensity: 110 mph (175 km/h) (1-min); <972 mbar (hPa)

A tropical storm was first detected about 570 mi (920 km) northeast of the northern Leeward Islands on September 2. The cyclone moved west-northwestward and reached hurricane status early on September 3, based on a ship observation of 81 mph (130 km/h) winds. Later that day, the storm curved northwestward. Intensifying further, the system became a Category 2 hurricane late on September 4. While passing west of Bermuda early the following day, winds of at least 60 mph (100 km/h) bring down trees and shatter windows, while many boats were swamped or blown aground. Early on September 5, the hurricane peaked with maximum sustained winds of 110 mph (175 km/h) and a minimum barometric pressure 972 mbar (28.7 inHg).

The storm weakened after passing Bermuda, falling to Category 1 intensity hurricane at 06:00 UTC on September 6, about 12 hours before weakening to a tropical storm. By 00:00 UTC on September 7, the system transitioned into an extratropical cyclone. The remnant extratropical storm struck Nova Scotia and Newfoundland before dissipating over the latter on September 8. A total of 21 deaths occurred in Nova Scotia after the Otokio wrecked at Sober Island and the Belle of Burgeo disappeared near Sambro Island.

=== Tropical Storm Six ===
- Tropical storm (SSHWS)
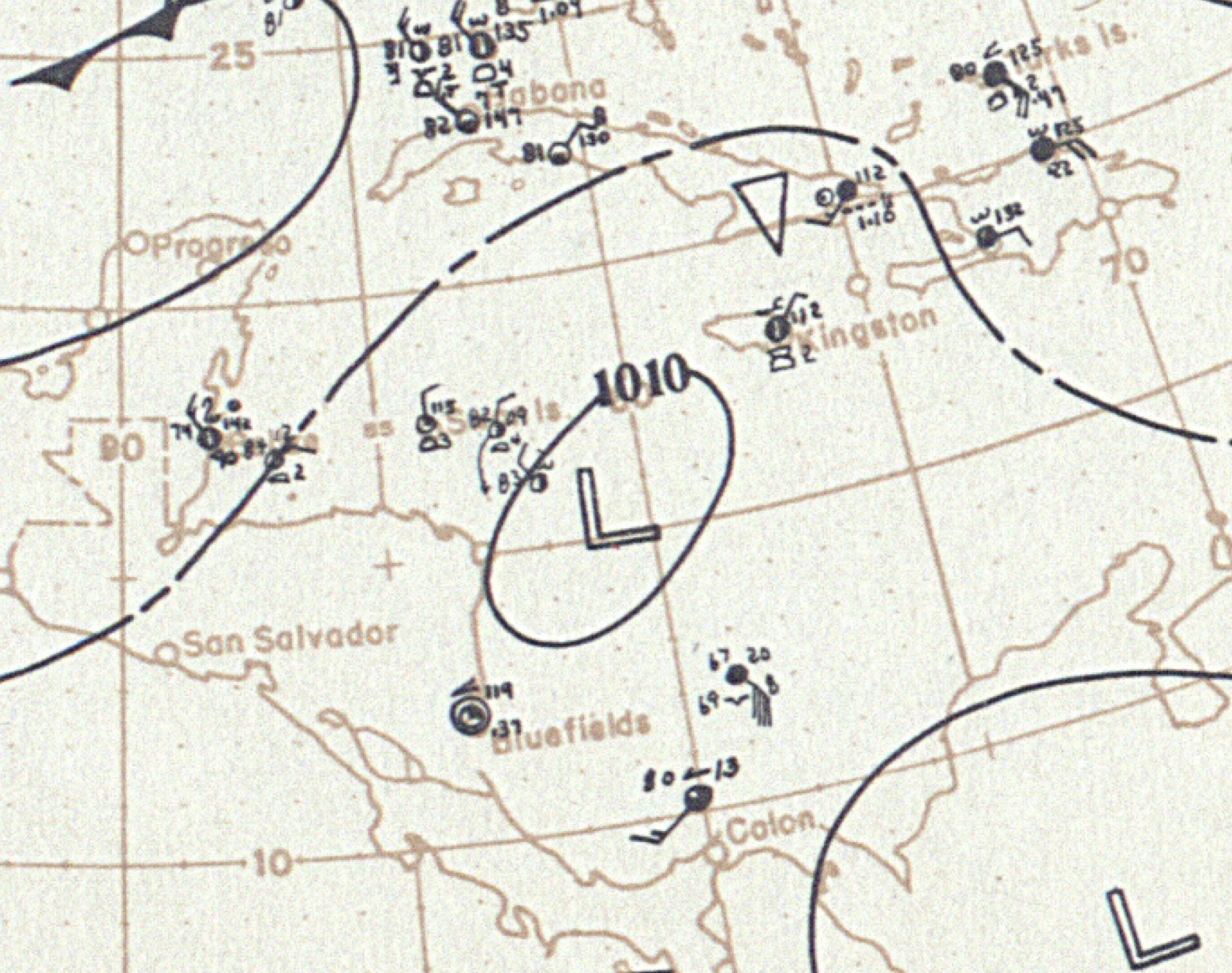
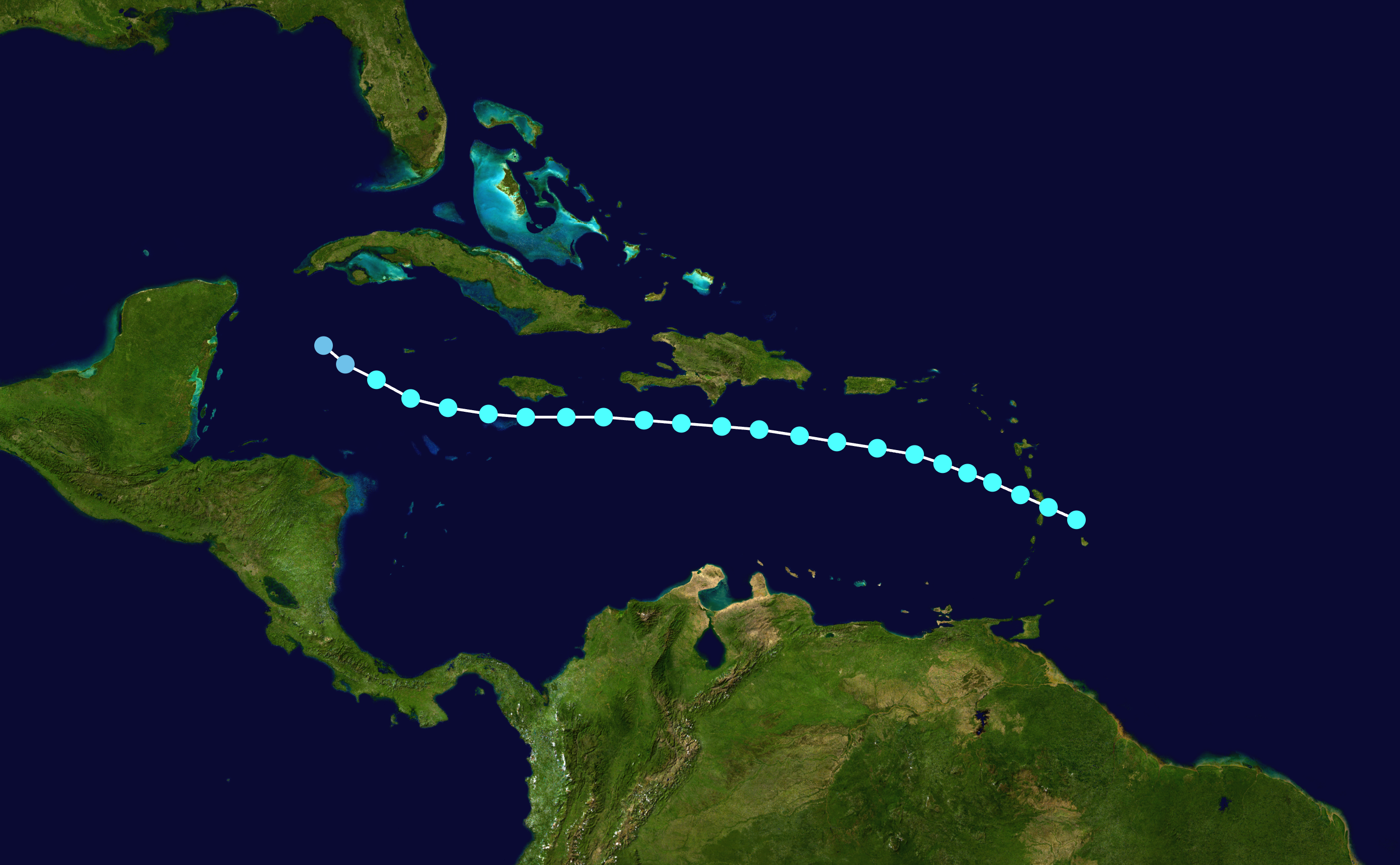
- Duration: September 9 – September 14
- Peak intensity: 45 mph (75 km/h) (1-min);

A tropical wave developed into a tropical storm just north of Barbados early on September 9. Later that day, the storm crossed the Windward Islands, passing between Martinique and Saint Lucia. While moving west-northwest to westward across the Caribbean, the cyclone only strengthened slightly. Early on September 11, the storm peaked with maximum sustained winds of 45 mph (75 km/h). In real time, it was believed that the cyclone curved nearly due northward on September 12 and crossed Haiti before dissipating near Great Abaco Island on September 14. However, observations from the Greater Antilles suggest that the storm continued westward. Upon reaching the northwestern Caribbean on September 14, the storm weakened to a tropical depression, before dissipating about 170 mi (270 km) west of the Cayman Islands around 12:00 UTC. On Guadeloupe, heavy rains caused flooding in the suburbs of Pointe-à-Pitre.

=== Tropical depressions ===
In addition to the six officially recognized tropical storms and hurricanes, four tropical depressions in the 1918 season have been identified. The first developed in June from a trough of low pressure in the eastern Gulf of Mexico and moved east across Florida. Although it is possible that the system attained tropical storm intensity, a lack of supporting evidence precludes its designation as such. It is thought that the tropical depression developed on June 20 and dissipated on June 23. The second depression evolved from a tropical wave on September 13 in the eastern Atlantic. It persisted until September 17, when the system was lost over the open ocean, although it is possible that the system persisted thereafter. On September 25, the third tropical depression formed in the northwestern Caribbean. It tracked northward into the eastern Gulf of Mexico and transitioned into an extratropical cyclone before dissipating on September 30. The final depression of the 1918 season developed on October 14 while situated in the southern Gulf of Mexico. While tracking northwestward, the depression experienced little change in intensity and made landfall in Louisiana three days after formation. It dissipated over land on October 19.

== See also ==
- 1900–1940 South Pacific cyclone seasons
- 1900–1950 South-West Indian Ocean cyclone seasons
- 1910s Australian region cyclone seasons
