= List of New England hurricanes =

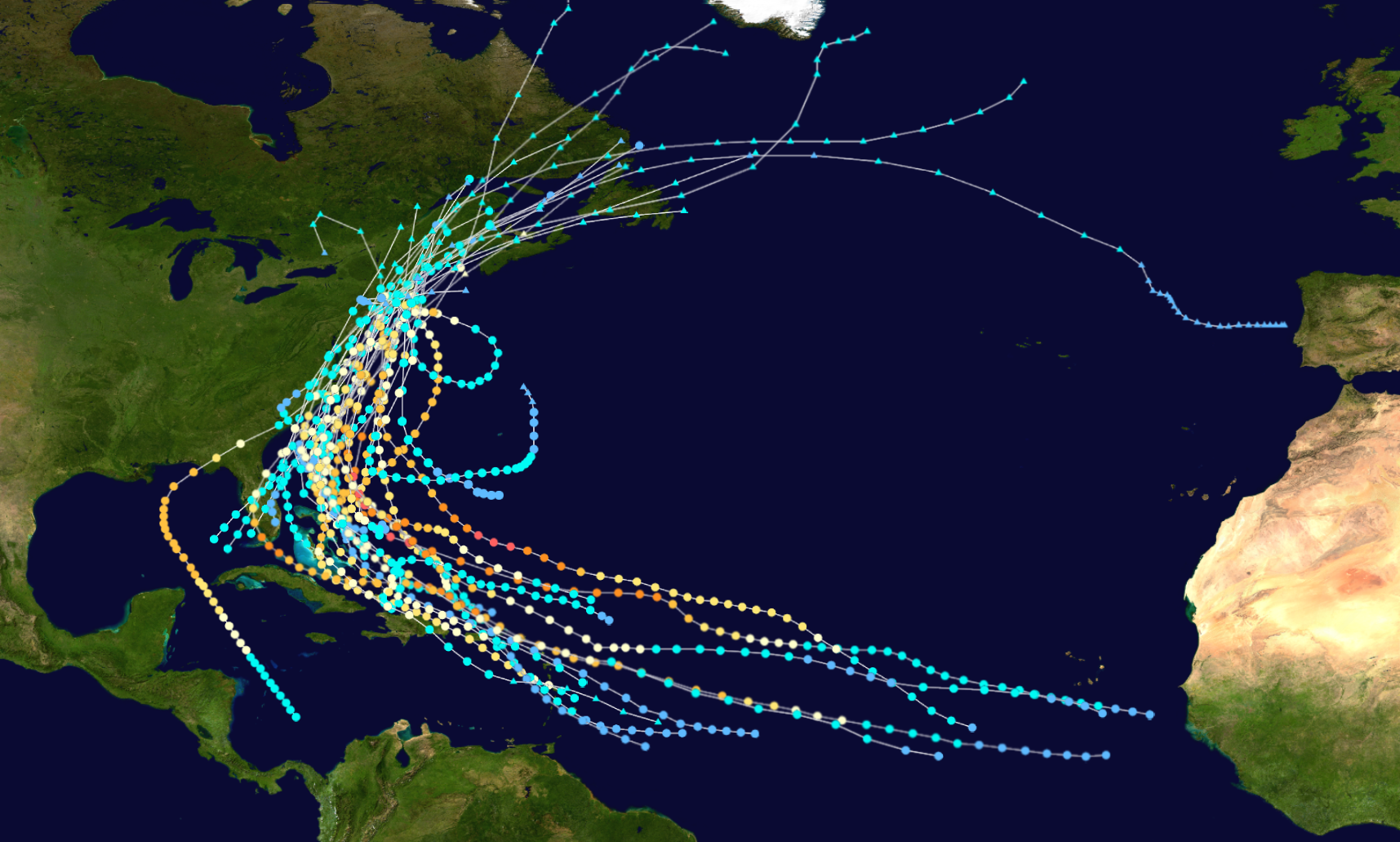
Tracks of all tropical cyclones to strike New England from 1851 - 2025.

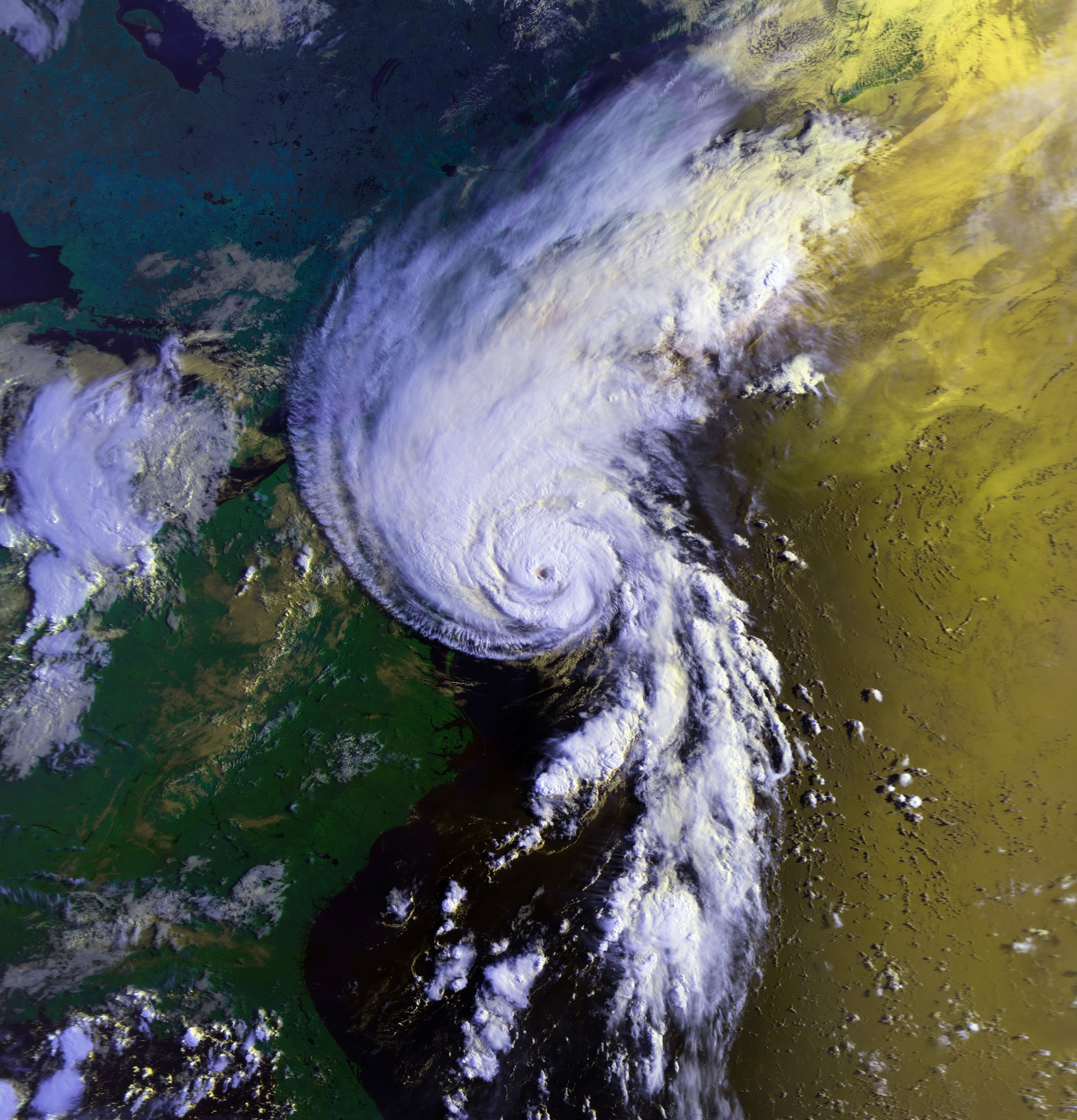
Hurricane Bob, the most recent tropical cyclone to make landfall in New England at hurricane strength on August 19, 1991

A New England hurricane is a tropical cyclone originating in the Atlantic Ocean that affects the U.S. states of Connecticut, Rhode Island, Massachusetts, Vermont, New Hampshire and/or Maine. Due to geography and climatology the vast majority of tropical cyclone strikes to the New England region occur in Connecticut, Rhode Island and eastern Massachusetts.

Since record keeping began for Atlantic tropical cyclones in 1851 there have been approximately 30 tropical cyclones to strike New England direct. The location of New England means that most tropical cyclones that threaten the region tend to recurve out to sea, mainly owing to upper-level steering patterns such as the jet stream. Tropical cyclones also tend to weaken upon approach owing to the cooler waters above 40 latitude (near southeastern Massachusetts). Thus tropical cyclone formation near New England and over the Gulf of Maine is very unfavorable. However tropical cyclones moving up the East Coast of the United States can rapidly approach the Connecticut and Rhode Island coast before they encounter the cooler waters off southeast Massachusetts and strike far southern New England as a category 3 hurricane. Both Connecticut and Rhode Island have been struck several times by a major hurricane since 1850.

Most commonly, New England will see the remnants or weakening stage of most tropical cyclones that make landfall either along the United States east coast or Gulf coast. This can sometimes lead to excessive rainfall, and in some cases destructive flooding. Hurricane Diane in 1955 produced over 19 inches of rain in Massachusetts and contributed to the 1955 Connecticut floods, one of the worst flooding events in Connecticut's history. More recently, in 2011, a weakening Hurricane Irene produced historic flooding in Vermont, causing over $175 million in damage.

The return period for hurricane and major landfalls along the coast of New England is highest in Connecticut and Rhode Island, and declines rapidly north toward Maine. Generally, the return period for hurricane-force winds is 12–16 years along the coast of Connecticut and Rhode Island (which is for example higher than the coast of Georgia much farther south), to more than 50 years along the Maine coast.

Due to the fact that sea surface temperatures from eastern Massachusetts northward are generally too cool to support a major tropical cyclone, the region very rarely sees a major hurricane landfall (Category 3 or higher). Since 1851, only 3 major hurricanes have ever made landfall on the New England coastline, and all of these were in Connecticut and Rhode Island. The return period for storms of such strength along the southern New England coastline is considered to be 50–70 years, and upwards of 300 years in coastal Maine. As of 2022, the most recent major hurricane to make landfall in the region was Hurricane Carol in 1954.

On September 21, 1938, a Category 3 hurricane made landfall over New Haven, Connecticut with sustained winds of 115 mph (gusts of 150 mph) and a pressure of 941 millibars. Many coastal towns and cities on the Connecticut and Rhode Island coast suffered extreme damage. The coastal community of Napatree Point, Rhode Island was hit with a 20 - foot storm surge and the day after the cyclone was totally gone (34 killed). The cyclone produced very high wind gusts inland at higher elevations, delivering a 186 mph wind gust to the Blue Hill Observatory in Massachusetts and a 163 mph gust atop Mount Washington. A storm surge of 10–18 feet from Long Island Sound to Narragansett Bay, it is often considered to be the most intense hurricane to ever strike New England in modern times. One estimate from Rhode Island stated the water level "reflects a storm occurring roughly once every 400 years. A study of sand deposits also gives more evidence that this was the strongest hurricane to hit Rhode Island in over 300 years, since 1635."

== List of New England Tropical Cyclones ==
Saffir–Simpson scale
TD	TS	C1	C2	C3	C4	C5

=== Pre–17th century ===
Multiple intense hurricanes (Category 3+) are noted to have possibly struck New England in pre-Columbian times: between 1100 and 1150, 1300–1400 (1295–1407), and 1400–1450 (1404–1446), respectively.

=== 17th century ===
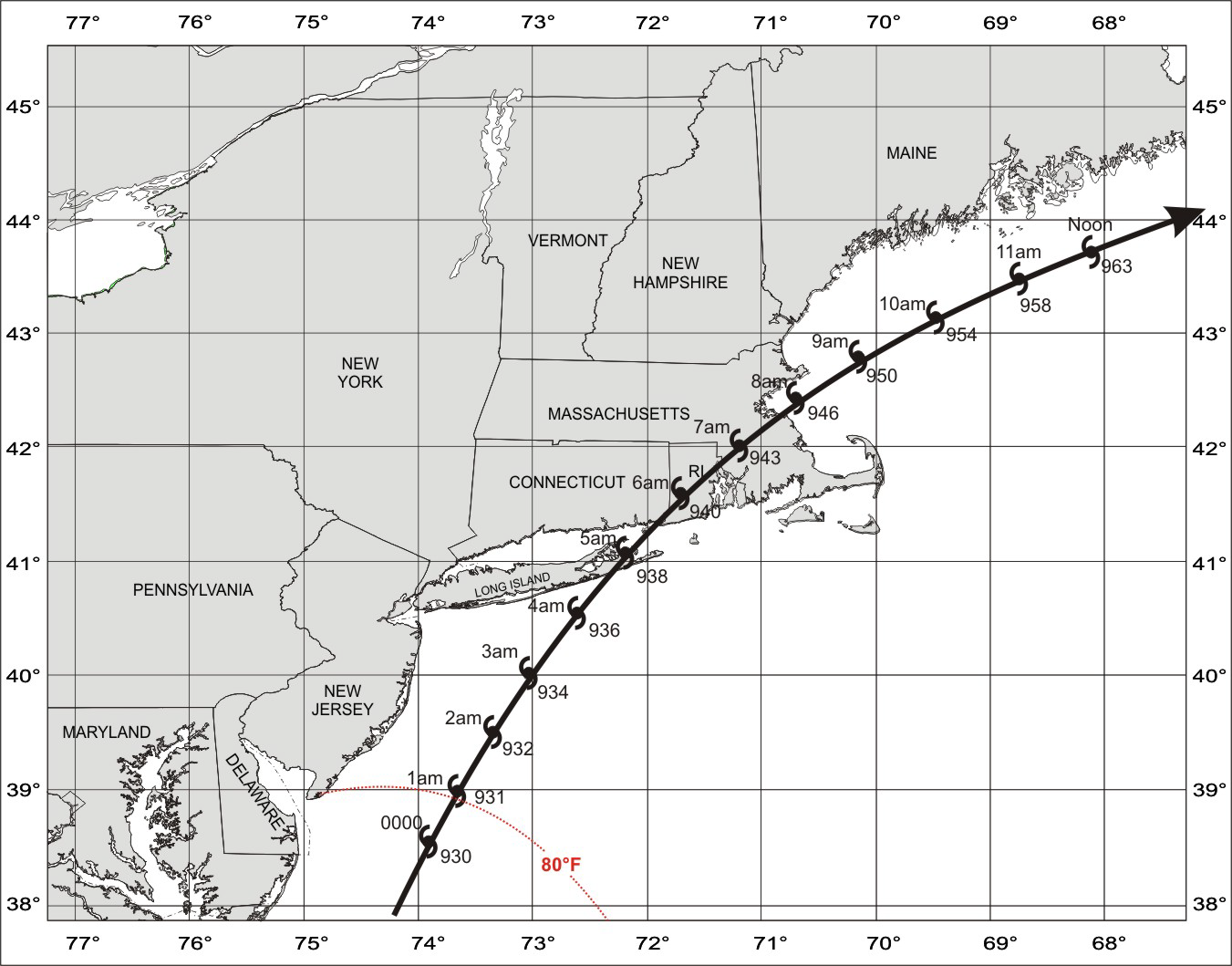
- The estimated track and intensity of the Great Colonial Hurricane of 1635
  August 25, 1635 – The Great Colonial Hurricane struck Narragansett Bay, killing at least 46 people. This hurricane is often considered to be the most intense hurricane to hit New England since its European colonization. The only other storm of a similar magnitude was the 1938 hurricane.
- August 23, 1683 – A tropical cyclone hit Connecticut and caused tremendous flooding.
- October 29, 1693 – Another tropical cyclone struck New England and caused flooding so great that new permanent inlets were created.

=== 18th century ===
- October 18, 1703 – A tropical system caused great wind and flood damage; many ships were lost.
- February 23, 1723 – An off-season storm struck Cape Cod causing a great deal of damage, but no reported deaths.
- October 8, 1747 – Seven ships were destroyed, and "many" perished.
- September 8, 1769 – A hurricane that earlier caused great damage in Annapolis, Maryland; blew ashore boats at Boston and adjacent areas, Providence, and Newport. Some houses were blown down and destroyed.
- September 1775 – The Newfoundland hurricane apparently brought strong winds and/or waves to New England, though it is not known to have actually made landfall. This report may also be confused with the Independence Hurricane of September 2–3, 1775, which passed into New England from New York as a tropical depression or weak tropical storm.
- August 13, 1778 – A weakening hurricane that struck the Carolinas, and impacted the coasts of Massachusetts and Rhode Island but did not make landfall. This storm prevented a major battle between Britain and France off the coast of Rhode Island.
- November 1, 1778 – A possible late-season hurricane struck Cape Cod, Massachusetts, killing between 50 and 70 people. Twenty-three of these deaths are believed to be attributed to HMS Somerset III, a British ship which ran aground on Cape Cod during this storm.
- October 8–9, 1782 – A hurricane struck the Carolinas and moved up the coast, causing damage in Providence, Rhode Island. It is currently not known if this hurricane made landfall in New England.
- October 18–19, 1782 – A second hurricane moved up the coast and was considered more severe than the previous storm in portions of New England, especially Boston. This was a rare snow hurricane for New England and the storm was likely transforming into an extratropical cyclone as it approached the New England states.
- September 24–25, 1785 – A hurricane which made landfall near Ocracoke, North Carolina, impacted southern New England. Based on known observations, this hurricane remained offshore of New England but passed close enough to inflict heavy rain and strong winds to New York City and Boston.
- August 19, 1788 – A weakening hurricane moved up through eastern New York.

=== 19th century ===
- September 12, 1804 – The Antigua–Charleston hurricane, a major storm for the Caribbean, Georgia, and South Carolina, impacted portions of New England as a weakening tropical storm and then a tropical depression before dissipating off the coast of Nova Scotia.
- October 9, 1804 – As the Snow hurricane crossed New England, cool air became entrained in the circulation, and it became extratropical. The storm brought heavy snow across the Northeast, in some areas up to 2–3 feet (61–91 cm), and killed a total of 16 people; one on land and fifteen at sea. This was the second observation of snow from a landfalling hurricane, but not the last. This hurricane which peaked at Category 3 intensity was a major one, especially for eastern Massachusetts.
- October 3, 1805 – A hurricane that struck Mantanzas, Cuba reportedly reached the District of Maine (part of Massachusetts until 1820) as a tropical cyclone. Little information is available on this storm, however, a tropical cyclone exclusively striking Maine is not unique. This is what occurred during the passage of both Hurricane Gerda in 1969 and Tropical Storm Heidi in 1971.
- September 1815 – What was once a major hurricane in the Carolinas brought tropical-storm-force winds to portions of New England. The likely track of this cyclone takes it very near but offshore of Nantucket.

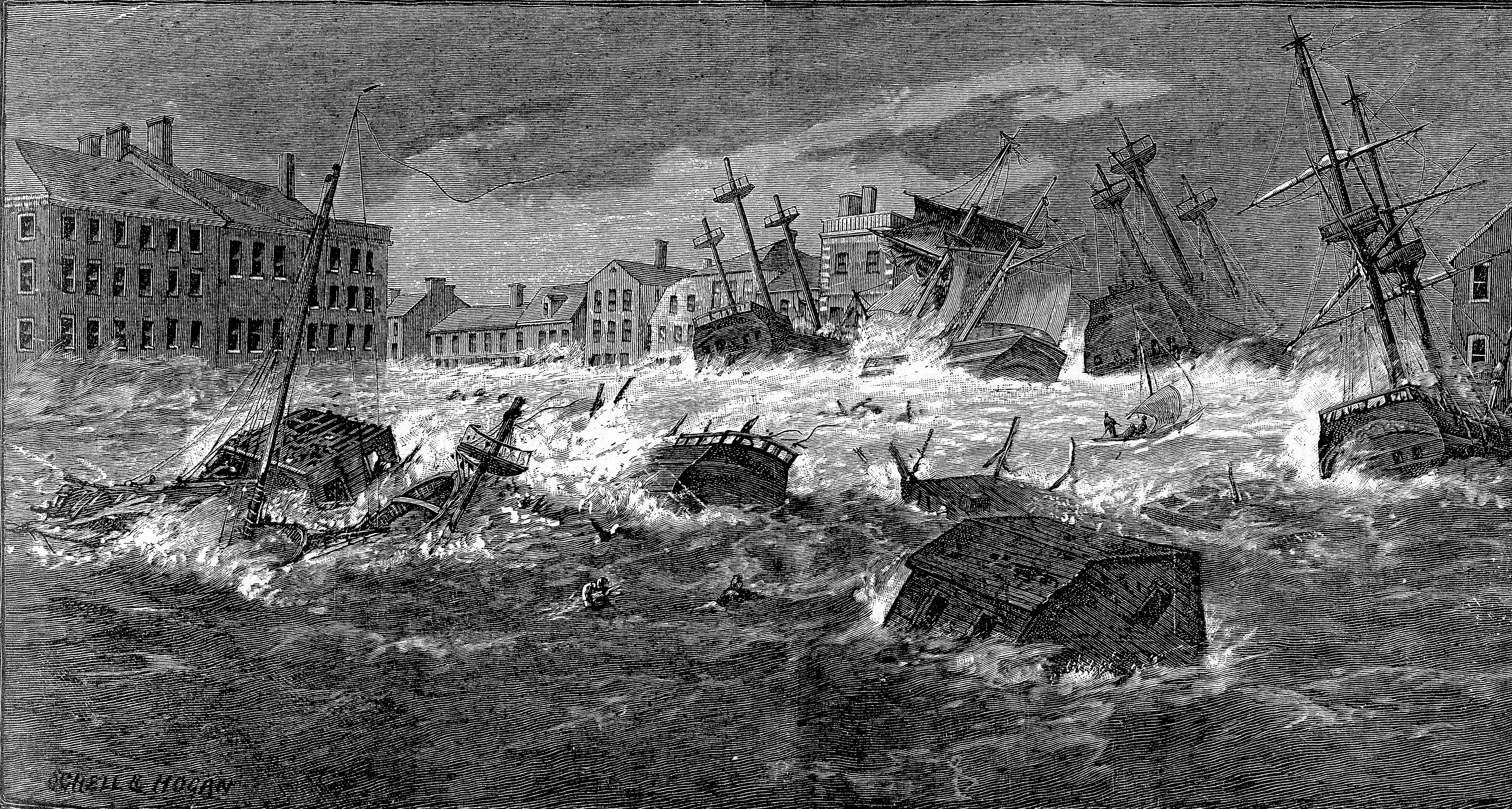
An artist's depiction of the 1815 New England hurricane in Providence, Rhode Island

- September 23–24, 1815 – The 1815 New England hurricane struck New England as a major hurricane and delivered an 11-foot-high (3.4 m) storm surge that funneled up Narragansett Bay. The hurricane destroyed some 500 houses and 35 ships and flooded Providence, Rhode Island. It also caused at least 38 deaths throughout New England.
- August 12, 1817 – A hurricane that was first reported near Tobago made landfall on the Florida panhandle and moved slowly up the coast. As either a weak tropical storm or tropical depression, the system brought rain to New York and portions of New England on the 12th before moving into Quebec.
- September 4, 1821 – The Norfolk and Long Island hurricane was a very powerful tropical cyclone that made landfall within the modern day limits of New York City. It sliced through New England and was likely extratropical as it moved along the Maine coastline.
- June 4–5, 1825 – An early-season hurricane formed in late May near Santo Domingo and later struck Cuba, Florida, and South Carolina before moving up the Mid-Atlantic coast and into New England. Hurricane conditions were reported as far north as New York City, and the cyclone's status as a tropical cyclone in New England is debatable given the early date.
- August 27, 1827 – The St. Kitts Hurricane impacted the eastern seaboard from Wilmington, North Carolina, to Portsmouth, New Hampshire. It is possible that this cyclone made landfall along the United States, but there are also conflicting reports that say it remained offshore of Cape Hatteras, Delaware, and Nantucket. August 1827 was a very active month with at least four hurricanes impacting the North Atlantic.
- August 1830 – Two hurricanes passed close to southeastern Massachusetts within a week of each other. First came the Atlantic Coast Hurricane on August 19 followed by a second hurricane around the 25th. Damage from these two systems was duly noted on Nantucket. It appears that the later system approached the region from the southeast before turning out to sea southeast of Cape Cod.
- October 11, 1830 – A third hurricane impacted New England in 1830 but like the two in August, this cyclone did not make landfall in New England. Barnstable, Massachusetts, reported the storm.
- July 19, 1835 – The remnants of a hurricane that struck Florida twice moved into northern New England from New York.
- August 30, 1839 – A hurricane moved up the east coast but did not make landfall. Fringe effects were felt on Long Island and southeastern New England.
- October 3, 1841 – The October Gale became an extratropical storm, and passed off the coast of New England. The system dropped snow and sleet in Connecticut, bringing up to 18 inches (46 cm) of snow in some areas. The storm wrecked the Georges Bank fishing fleet which drowned 81 fishermen and knocked down trees, tore roofs off houses and forced boats to go up on shore. The storm also destroyed a saltworks factory along Cape Cod, sending the economy to a slump. In 1842, a monument was erected to remember the sailors and fishermen lost at sea.
- October 14, 1846 – The Great Havana Hurricane was still a strong tropical cyclone when it passed into New England from New York. In Hartford, Connecticut, hurricane-force winds destroyed a trestle bridge. Numerous apple orchards in Massachusetts were reported ruined. No deaths due to the hurricane's passage over New England were reported.
- October 6, 1849 – A tropical cyclone made landfall in Massachusetts, causing 143 deaths. This was the first known tropical cyclone known to have made landfall in New England since June 1825.
- 1850 – Three tropical cyclones impacted New England this season. The remnants of a July hurricane in the Carolinas passed into New England. An August hurricane caused damage in its wake through New England but was probably a tropical storm. Finally, a September hurricane passed off the coast causing some damage.
- October 19, 1851 – A tropical storm formed north of the Bahamas on October 16. It continued northward and reached a peak intensity of 70 mph (113 km/h). But it weakened to a 60 mph (97 km/h)-storm before making landfall in Rhode Island on the 19th. Later that day it dissipated on the border between Rhode Island and Massachusetts.
- September 16, 1858 – A Category 1 hurricane made landfall on the Connecticut-Rhode Island border and brought heavy rain to New England before exiting Maine as a tropical storm. It then continued northeast until it dissipated just over the other side of the Gulf of St. Lawrence on the 17th.
- September 28, 1861 – The Equinoctial Storm hit Connecticut as a 60 mph (97 km/h) tropical storm. It then continued east-northeast and dissipated in extreme eastern Maine later that day.
- November 3, 1861 – The Expedition hurricane struck eastern Connecticut as a 60 mph (97 km/h) tropical storm. It then continued northeast until dissipating over southern Maine later that day.
- September 19, 1863 – A tropical storm made landfall in New York and brought strong winds to western New England.
- October 30, 1866 – A tropical storm made landfall in New Jersey, Long Island, and New York City and began to parallel the New York-New England border until it briefly entered Vermont and dissipated.
- September 8, 1869 – A Category 3 hurricane made landfall in Rhode Island, before moving north and dissipating in Maine. There was one confirmed death in Massachusetts. Offshore Maine, a schooner capsized, killing all but one of the twelve crew. The storm also caused at least $50,000 (1869 USD) in damage in Maine alone.
- October 4, 1869 – The Saxby Gale crossed Cape Cod and Martha's Vineyard as a Category 2 hurricane, before striking Maine as a Category 1 hurricane. In Maine, heavy rainfall caused widespread flooding, and high winds destroyed at least 90 houses. A very high storm tide also occurred in the Bay of Fundy, and the storm killed at least 37 people offshore of Nova Scotia.
- October 9–13, 1878 – A Category 1 hurricane passed offshore, resulting in heavy rains and strong winds, causing 27 deaths.
- October 10, 1894 – A Category 1 hurricane struck Connecticut.
- September 10, 1896 – A Category 1 hurricane struck Massachusetts.
- September 24, 1897 – A tropical storm hit Connecticut with maximum sustained winds of 50 mph (80 km/h). It continued up through all the New England states except for Vermont.
- October 6, 1898 – A hurricane came from the west and hit Maine as a tropical depression, then continued east into Atlantic Canada.
- November 1, 1899 – A hurricane struck New England as a 50 mph (80 km/h) extratropical storm.

=== 20th century ===
- August 1904 – An extratropical storm with hurricane-force winds left behind damage in southeastern Massachusetts, especially Martha's Vineyard. Trees were downed in Providence, Rhode Island, and New Bedford, Massachusetts. Center moved NE just within the coastline from Carolinas, with its eastern sector intact over ocean. The storm then tracked across Long Island and eastern Rhode Island. Much marine destruction with heavy losses in Buzzards Bay, Vineyard Sound and Massachusetts Bay.
- July 21, 1916 – A Category 1 hurricane moved north from open Atlantic, crossing the Buzzards Bay/Cape Cod area of Massachusetts. Hourly wind reports indicated sustained 50 mph (80 km/h) but actual winds were higher than hourly observations. Gusts of 85 mph (137 km/h) recorded in southeast Massachusetts and Cape Cod.
- August 1917 – A tropical storm sank four ships while passing offshore of Nantucket, Massachusetts, killing 41 sailors. The storm later made landfall in New Brunswick before becoming post-tropical.
- August 1924 – A Category 1 hurricane with a large center moved over and just east of Cape Cod. It was a severe hurricane in New Bedford and Martha's Vineyard, Massachusetts. New Bedford Newspaper (Mercury) published photo journal of the hurricanes severity. The system is often overlooked, however much material is present to include it as destructive storm. On Cape Cod, Martha's Vineyard and Nantucket, it is often considered worse than the 1938 hurricane. Widespread wind losses to structures were reported. Very heavy tree damage in New Bedford north to Plymouth Massachusetts. The storm was later destructive in Nova Scotia.
- November 3–4, 1927 – The remnants of a tropical storm spawned torrential rains as it passed over the Green Mountains in Vermont. The record flooding caused $40 million in damage and killed 84 people in Vermont and 1 in Rhode Island. The storm ended as snow in the mountains. Note that this flood was unrelated to the 1927 Mississippi Flood.
- September 9, 1934 – A strong tropical storm crossed Long Island and lost strength from slow movement as it moved through Connecticut much in a similar manner as Hurricane Belle of August 1976. Trees downed in Providence, Rhode Island, and New Haven, Conn.
- September 1936 – A Category 1 hurricane moved east-northeast over Block Island and Nantucket Sounds after moving up East Coast of U.S. north of North Carolina and Virginia. The storm was destructive in Providence, Rhode Island, and eastern Massachusetts. Boston had 80 mph (129 km/h) winds at 8 a.m. on the 18th as the storm moved east along the south coast of Cape Cod and the Islands. There was much media coverage, but this storm was later eclipsed by the extreme hurricane two years later. Heavy wind-damage was realized across all of eastern Massachusetts.

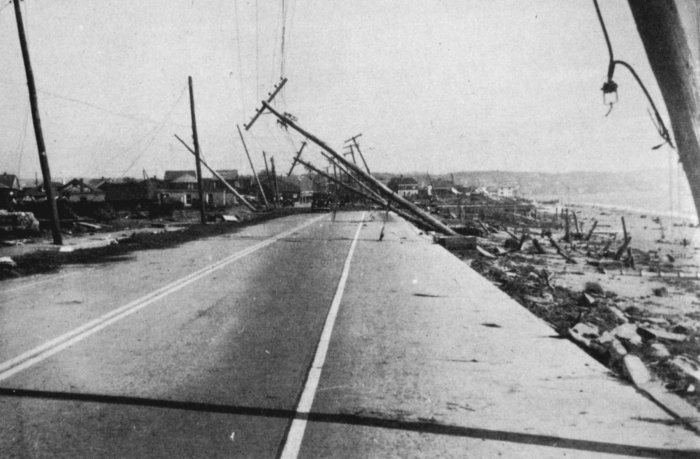
Damage in coastal Rhode Island following the 1938 New England hurricane

- September 21, 1938 – 1938 New England hurricane – This storm made landfall on Long Island and Connecticut as a Category 3 hurricane. Wind gusts reached Category 5 strength in eastern Connecticut, Rhode Island and southern Massachusetts west of Buzzards Bay and Cape Cod. The anemometer at the Blue Hill Observatory registered a peak wind gust of 186 mph (299 km/h) before the instrument broke. The hurricane lost strength as it tracked into interior areas of New England and became extratropical as it entered Vermont. The storm killed over 600 people and is considered to be the worst hurricane to strike New England in modern times.
- September 15, 1944 – The Great Atlantic Hurricane made landfall near the Connecticut/Rhode Island border as a Category 1 hurricane, causing severe wind damage in southeastern Massachusetts and across the Cape and Islands. Damage on Cape Cod and Martha's Vineyard was considered worse than that in 1938, with severe wind damage in New Bedford, Massachusetts. Much structural damage and much of the forest that had somehow escaped being decimated in 1938 fell victim to this storm. A total of 28 people died in New England due to the hurricane.
- September 1950 – Hurricane Dog was a major offshore hurricane that moved very close to Nantucket. Hurricane conditions occurred across southeast Massachusetts. Winds gusted near hurricane force on Nantucket and along the New England coast.
- September 7, 1953 – Hurricane Carol made landfall near Saint John, New Brunswick, Canada, with considerable wind losses throughout the region. This hurricane was eclipsed by the extreme damage of another Carol the very next year.

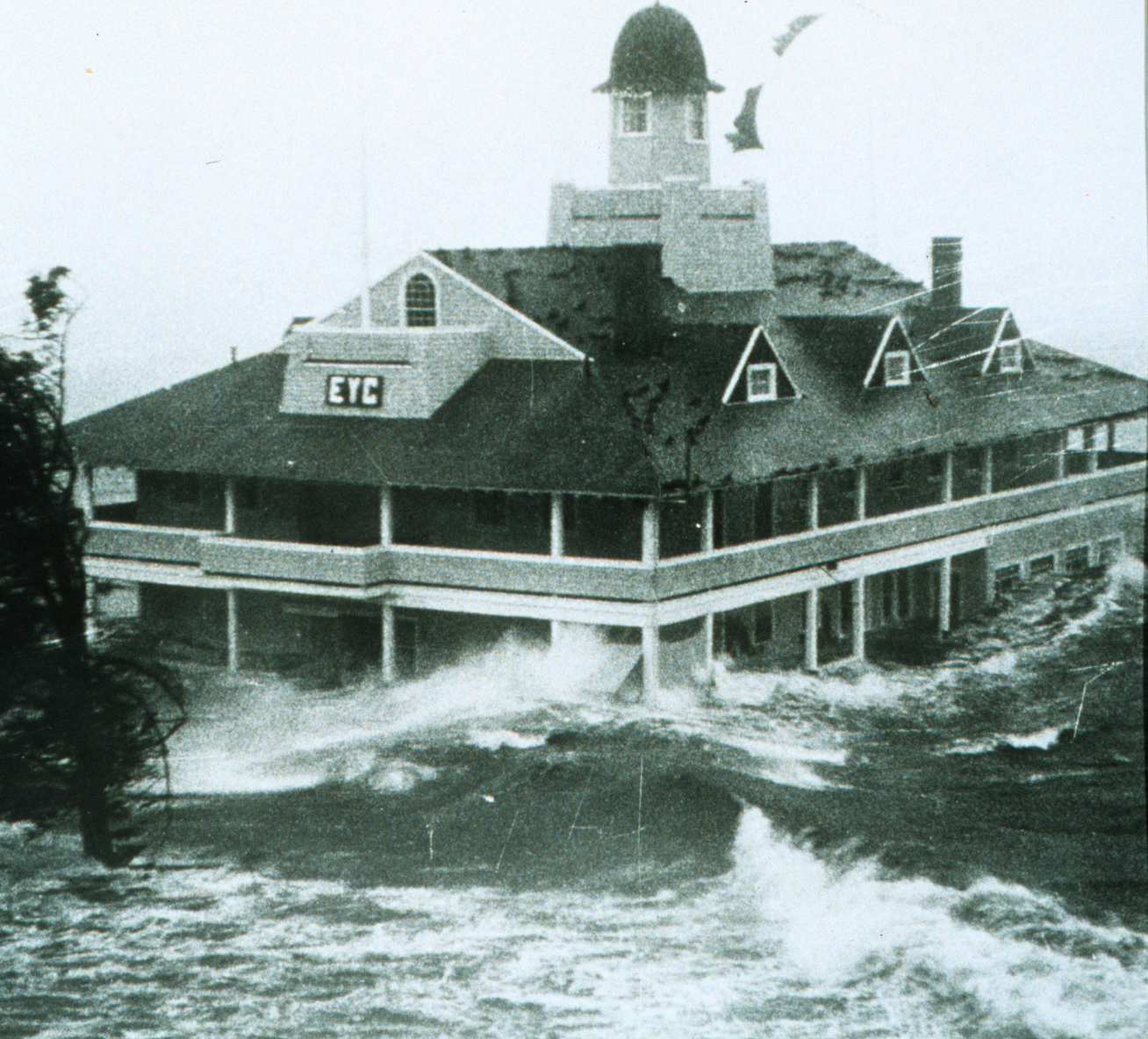
The Edgewood Yacht Club in Rhode Island during Hurricane Carol in 1954

- August 31, 1954 – Hurricane Carol made landfall as a Category 3 hurricane, in eastern Connecticut, southern Rhode Island, and south-coastal Massachusetts in the Buzzards Bay area, west of Cape Cod. Wind gusts of 135 mph (217 km/h) at Block Island, Rhode Island, and 115- mph at TF Green Airport in Warwick, Rhode Island were reported. Although at elevation, winds of 125 mph (201 km/h) in Milton, Massachusetts, were recorded. At least 68 people were killed across New England. Extreme damage was reported in southeast Connecticut, south coastal Rhode Island and south coastal Massachusetts. Storm surge damage along the Rhode Island ocean front was severe, with many homes and buildings swept away. Damage in the Buzzards Bay region rivaled that of the 1938 hurricane. In Groton Long Point, CT, 90% of the homes were damaged or destroyed. A barometric pressure of 956 mb (28.26 in) in Groton, Connecticut where the eye crossed the coastline.
- September 11, 1954 – Hurricane Edna made landfall on Cape Cod and Martha's Vineyard as a strong Category 2 hurricane, just two weeks after Carol, with very severe losses occurring. Hourly wind readings of 90 mph (145 km/h) were recorded at New Bedford Airport in New Bedford, Massachusetts; 100 mph (161 km/h) in Taunton, Massachusetts, 112 mph (180 km/h) in Milton, Massachusetts, and 125 mph (201 km/h) in Chilmark, Martha's Vineyard.
- July 11, 1959 – Hurricane Cindy scraped New England.
- September 12–13, 1960 – Hurricane Donna made landfall on Long Island, New York as a minimal Category 2 hurricane, and in Connecticut as a strong Category 1 hurricane. Peak wind gusts of 140 mph (225 km/h) at the Blue Hill Observatory in Massachusetts and 135 mph (217 km/h) on Block Island, Rhode Island. Hourly peak wind gusts at New Bedford Airport in Massachusetts recorded 110 mph (177 km/h) winds from the south-southwest in a sheltered area. Heavy tree, utility, and structural damage was observed in southeastern Massachusetts, coastal New Hampshire and Maine. Donna was the sixth hurricane to hit southern New England in thirty years. Hourly wind speed readings at City Hall in downtown New Bedford, Massachusetts recorded 80 mph (129 km/h) winds.
- September 26, 1961 – Hurricane Esther moved within 35 miles of the south coast of Rhode Island and Massachusetts as a Category 1 hurricane, before subsequently making a sharp right turn and then making a loop, returning as a tropical storm five days later. Esther remained offshore, but produced hurricane-force wind-gusts from Block Island, Rhode Island, eastward across Cape Cod, Massachusetts, Nantucket, and Martha's Vineyard. There was less damage than in Hurricane Donna one year prior. Wind gusts of 75 mph (121 km/h) to 90 mph (145 km/h) occurred onshore.
- October 7–8, 1962 – Hurricane Daisy remained offshore, but produced hurricane conditions in coastal northeastern Maine and on Mt. Desert Island.
- October 29, 1963 – Hurricane Ginny remained offshore, but produced hurricane conditions in Nantucket, Massachusetts, and along coastal northeastern Maine.
- September 8–11, 1969 – Hurricane Gerda brushed Cape Cod and made landfall at Eastport, Maine. No people were killed, though the storm was one of the strongest to hit Maine.
- August 28, 1971 – Tropical Storm Doria moved into Connecticut after crossing Long Island. Hurricane-force winds were measured at sea level in Bridgeport, Connecticut. Wind gusts up to 80 mph (129 km/h) in southeastern Massachusetts and Blue Hill Observatory.
- September 3, 1972 – Tropical Storm Carrie passed offshore of Cape Cod as a tropical storm, producing hurricane-force wind gusts of 90 mph (145 km/h) in Plymouth, Massachusetts, and 100 mph (160 km/h) in Hyannis, Massachusetts.
- August 10, 1976 – Hurricane Belle's rather slow movement enabled weakening to set in as the storm approached Long Island, New York, and then moved into Connecticut and Massachusetts, before transversing the Vermont/New Hampshire border. Wind gusts up to 92 mph (148 km/h) at the National Weather Service office in Bridgeport, Connecticut, 60 mph (97 km/h) in Providence, Rhode Island, and 75 mph (121 km/h) in Newport, Rhode Island.
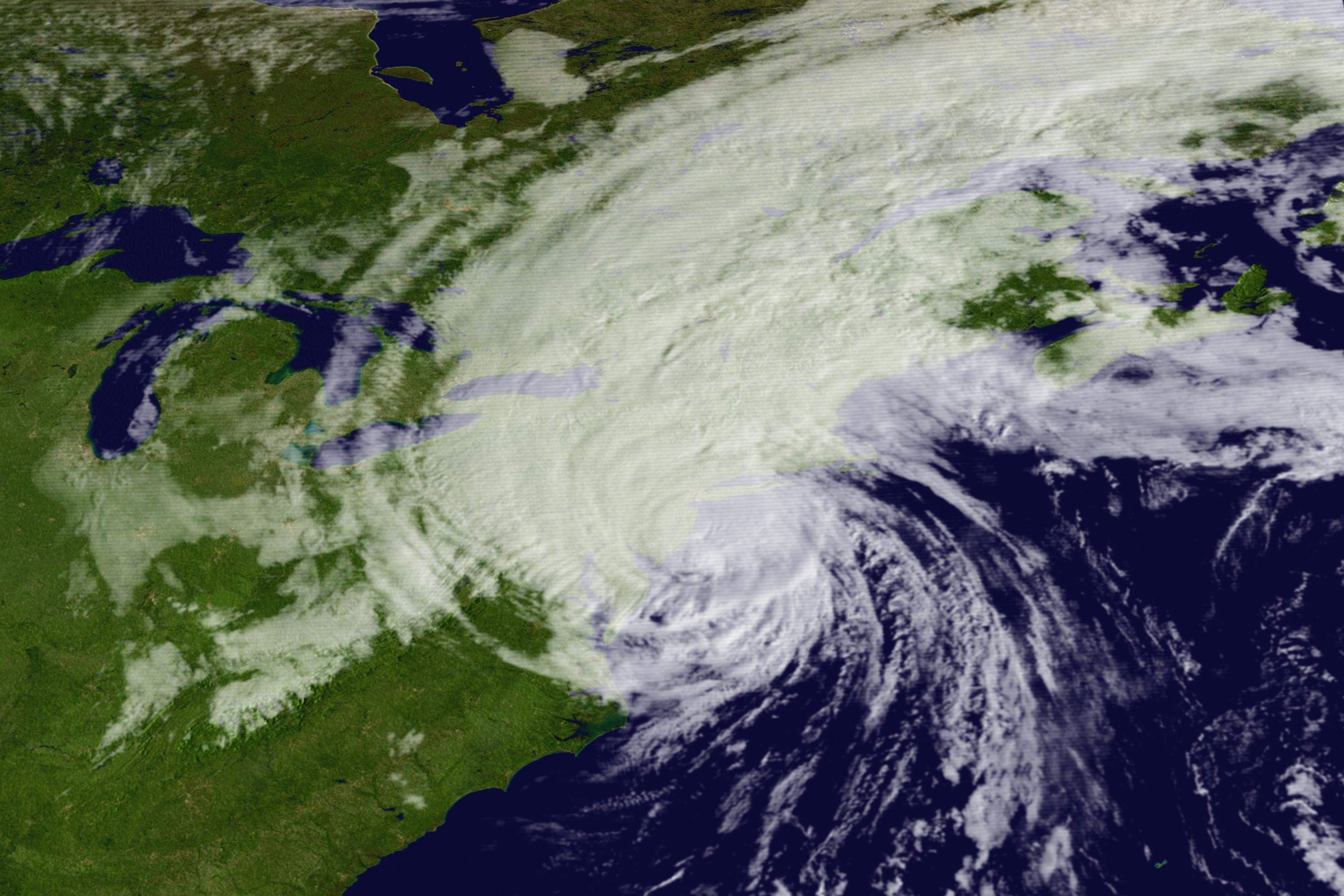
  Hurricane Gloria approaching New England on September 27, 1985.
- September 27, 1985 – Hurricane Gloria crossed Long Island and Connecticut as a Category 1 hurricane, making it the first hurricane of significant strength to hit southern New England since 1960. Widespread wind damage was reported in Connecticut, Rhode Island, and parts of Massachusetts, and later across coastal New Hampshire and Maine. The tree damage in Connecticut was the worst since the 1938 hurricane. The National Weather Service office in Bridgeport, Connecticut reported wind gusts to 90 mph, while New Bedford, Massachusetts, reported wind gusts over 90 mph (145 km/h), and in Rehoboth, Massachusetts, police barracks observed 120 mph (193 km/h) winds and also later reported a tornado in the vicinity. Winds at the T. F. Green Airport in Warwick, Rhode Island, gusted to 85 mph (137 km/h), and winds of 100 mph (161 km/h) were recorded on east side of Providence, near Brown University. Widespread forest damage occurred in Maine. Gloria also produced hurricane-force wind-gusts into New Brunswick, Canada.

Hurricane Bob approaching New England on August 19, 1991

- August 19, 1991 – Hurricane Bob made landfall on Block Island, Rhode Island, and Newport, Rhode Island, as a Category 2 hurricane. Winds gusted to Category 3 strength in southeastern Massachusetts. Bob was one of the smallest in area and yet most intense hurricanes to hit southern New England since 1938. Storm surge in the Buzzards Bay area of Massachusetts was comparable to that of Hurricane Carol; Bob was considered to be the worst storm on Martha's Vineyard since the 1944 hurricane. This hurricane was among the top twenty-five costliest U.S. hurricanes of twentieth century. The 1938 and 1944 hurricanes, as well as Carol in 1954, Donna in 1960, and Bob in 1991, are all on the list. A tidal surge of 10 feet (3.0 m) above normal was recorded in upper reaches of Buzzards Bay. A wind gust of 135 mph (217 km/h) was recorded at Block Island before the anemometer blew away. A 125 mph (201 km/h)h wind-gust was recorded in Newport, Rhode Island, and a 5-minute sustained wind speed of 111 mph (179 km/h) with gusts to 144 mph (232 km/h) was observed at Westport Harbour on the south coastal border of southern Massachusetts and Rhode Island. Additional wind recordings include a 120 mph (193 km/h) gust at the Massachusetts Maritime Academy on Buzzards Bay and a 120 mph (193 km/h) gust in Truro, Massachusetts. A one-minute sustained wind speed of 110 mph (177 km/h) was recorded on Chappaquiddick Island, Massachusetts. Several private anemometers in Falmouth, Massachusetts, on Cape Cod reported unofficial gusts of 150 mph (241 km/h). A New Bedford fishing boat off Cuttyhunk Island, Massachusetts, reported a peak gust of 162 mph (261 km/h).
- October 30 – November 1, 1991 – The Perfect Storm remained offshore, but produced wind gusts to 77 mph (124 km/h) over Cape Cod, and as far west as Jamestown, Rhode Island. Coastal damage was very high in exposed eastern Massachusetts due to high waves and tidal surge. Minor wind damage came just two months after Hurricane Bob, which produced major damage over southeast Massachusetts.
- August 28, 1992 – The remnants of Hurricane Andrew combined with a frontal boundary, and moved from the Mid-Atlantic states into New England. The system dropped light rain and produced light wind across the region.
- September 26, 1992 – The remnants of Tropical Storm Danielle moved just west of New England, but caused rainy conditions throughout the region.
- July 13, 1996 – Tropical Storm Bertha moved into southern New England as a strong tropical storm with 70 mph (113 km/h) sustained winds, and in some exposed areas, winds gusted to minimal hurricane force in southern Rhode Island and south coastal Massachusetts, west of Buzzards Bay. Overall, Bertha produced minor damage, but notable damage in coastal Rhode Island.
- September 2, 1996 – Hurricane Edouard passed offshore as a Category 1 hurricane, producing strong wind-gusts from Buzzards Bay eastward across Cape Cod and the islands of Nantucket and Martha's Vineyard. On Cape Cod, Edouard was a worse storm than Gloria in 1985, but not so destructive as Bob in 1991, which has become a benchmark hurricane on Cape Cod. Considerable losses occurred across Massachusetts, particularly in Oak Bluffs and Martha's Vineyard.
- October 8, 1996 – The remnants of Tropical Storm Josephine brushed Cape Cod, dropping widespread light rain and wind gusts of 45 mph (72 km/h) to 60 mph (97 km/h) in New Bedford, Massachusetts.
- July 26, 1997 – Tropical Storm Danny stalled just to the south of Nantucket, causing only minor damage, despite strong winds that were experienced in southeastern Massachusetts. The minor damage included minimal flooding, power outages, and downed tree limbs.
- September 17–18, 1999 – After paralleling much of the U.S. East Coast, Tropical Storm Floyd moved into Connecticut and tracked northward through Maine. Floyd caused large power-outages and major flood damage across the region, with over 5 inches (13 cm) of rain falling over most of the area. Danbury, Connecticut, received up to 15 inches (380 mm) of rain from the storm, resulting in extensive flooding in the city and surrounding areas. Mudslides were reported in the Berkshire Mountains of western Massachusetts. Several major highways and a countless number of local roads in Connecticut and Massachusetts were closed for several days due to flooding and downed trees and power lines. Hurricane-force wind gusts were observed in southern Rhode Island; North Kingston unofficially reported wind gusts to 90 mph (145 km/h). Wind gusts to 76 mph (122 km/h) were recorded at the New Bedford Hurricane Dike in New Bedford, Massachusetts, and 73 mph (117 km/h) in Hyannis, Massachusetts.

=== 21st century ===
- June 17, 2001 – Tropical Storm Allison brushed southern New England as a subtropical storm. In Connecticut, rainfall peaked at 7.2 inches (180 mm) in Pomfret, closing several roads, causing minor damage to numerous houses. In Rhode Island, the rainfall washed out several roads.
- September 11, 2002 – The interaction between Hurricane Gustav and the non-tropical system caused strong winds that affected areas of coastal New England, mainly in eastern New York and Massachusetts. The winds downed trees and power lines, and several homes and cars were damaged by falling trees; about 19,000 homes lost power in Massachusetts.
- September 2002 – The remnants of Tropical Storm Hanna contributed to around 1 in (25 mm) of rainfall in Vermont.
- September 28, 2002 – The extratropical remnants of Hurricane Isidore produced widespread light rainfall across the region. No damage or flooding was reported.
- September 2003 – Hurricane Fabian produced moderate surfing conditions along the East Coast of the United States.
- September 4, 2003 – The remnants of Tropical Storm Grace dropped light to moderate rainfall throughout the region, though no significant damages were reported.
- September 17, 2003 – The dissipating remnants of Tropical Storm Henri produced light rainfall.
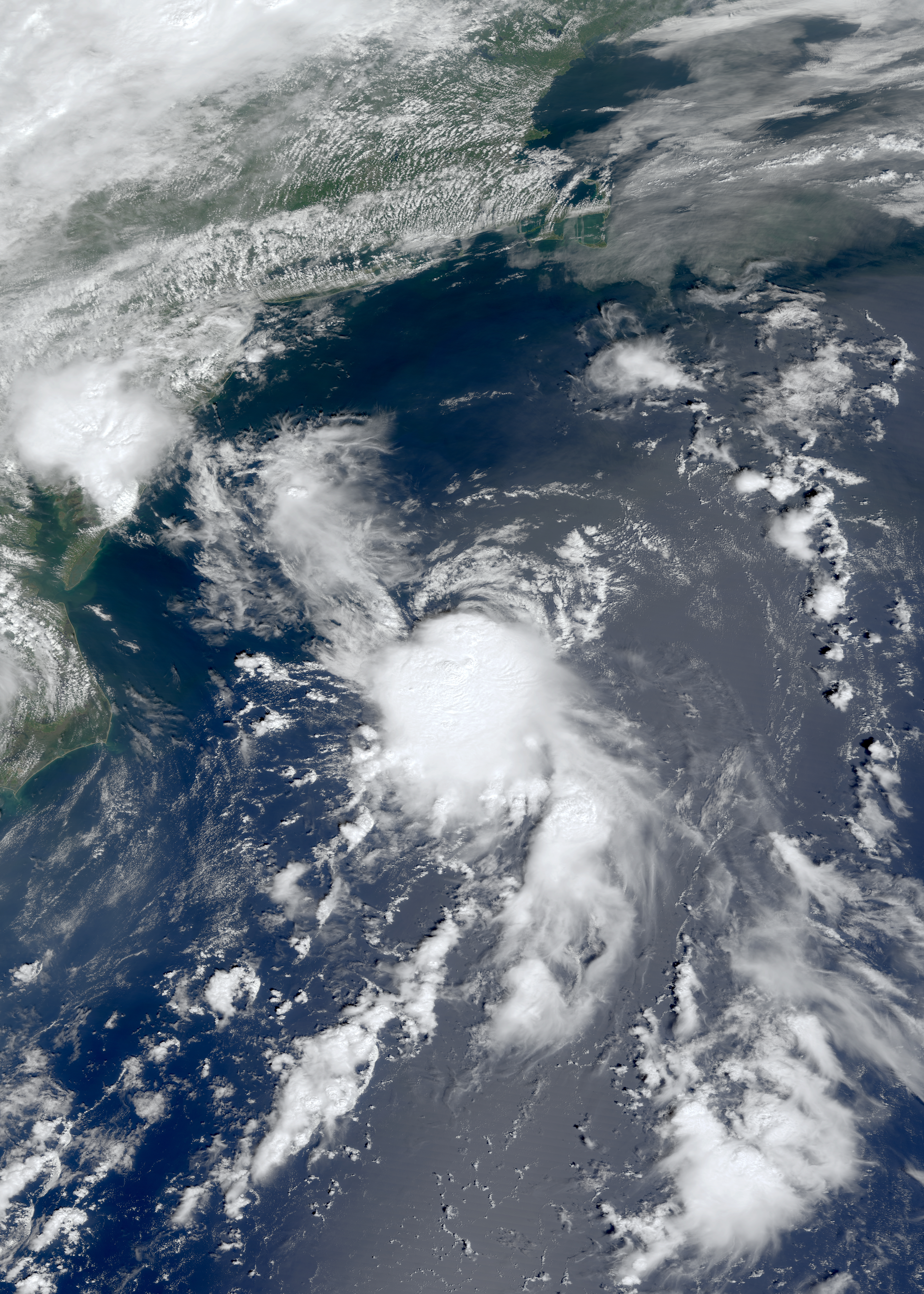
  Tropical Storm Hermine moving north towards New England on August 30, 2004.
- September 19, 2003 – Hurricane Isabel passed far to the west, though rainfall reached 1 inch (25 mm) in portions of western Connecticut and Massachusetts, and in portions of New Hampshire and Maine. Falling trees from moderate winds downed power lines across the region, causing sporadic power outages. Two people died as a result of the hurricane, both due to the rough surf. Damage in Vermont totals about $100,000 (2003 USD, $117,000 in 2008 USD).
- October 2003 – The interaction between Hurricane Kate and a high-pressure area to its north produced 3 to 4 foot (1 m) waves along the coast.
- August 14, 2004 – The extratropical remnants of Tropical Storm Bonnie produced heavy rainfall, with localized totals of up to 10 inches (250 mm). The rainfall flooded or washed out roads across the eastern Maine. In Aroostook County, Maine, the rainfall caused a mudslide, narrowing a county road to one lane.
- August 15, 2004 – Tropical Storm Charley dissipated near southern Massachusetts, though the remnant moisture produced up to 5 in (130 mm) of rainfall, particularly in Maine. In Rhode Island, one man drowned in a rip current generated by the system.
- August 31, 2004 – Moisture from Hurricane Gaston dropped up to 3.69 in (94 mm) of rainfall.
- August 31, 2004 – Tropical Storm Hermine came ashore near New Bedford, Massachusetts, as a minimal tropical storm. Damage was minimal, and effects were limited to gusty winds and light rainfall.
- September 10, 2004 – The remnants of Hurricane Frances produced light, yet widespread rainfall; the system eventually crossed northern Maine.
- September 19, 2004 – A plume of moisture broke off from the remnants of Hurricane Ivan and progressed northward, producing heavy rainfall across portions of the Mid-Atlantic and New England. The rain caused extensive roadway flooding in Connecticut, and resulted in minor river flooding in other areas.
- September 29, 2004 – Moisture from the remnants of Hurricane Jeanne produced light to heavy rainfall, with totals of over 7 inches (180 mm) on Nantucket.

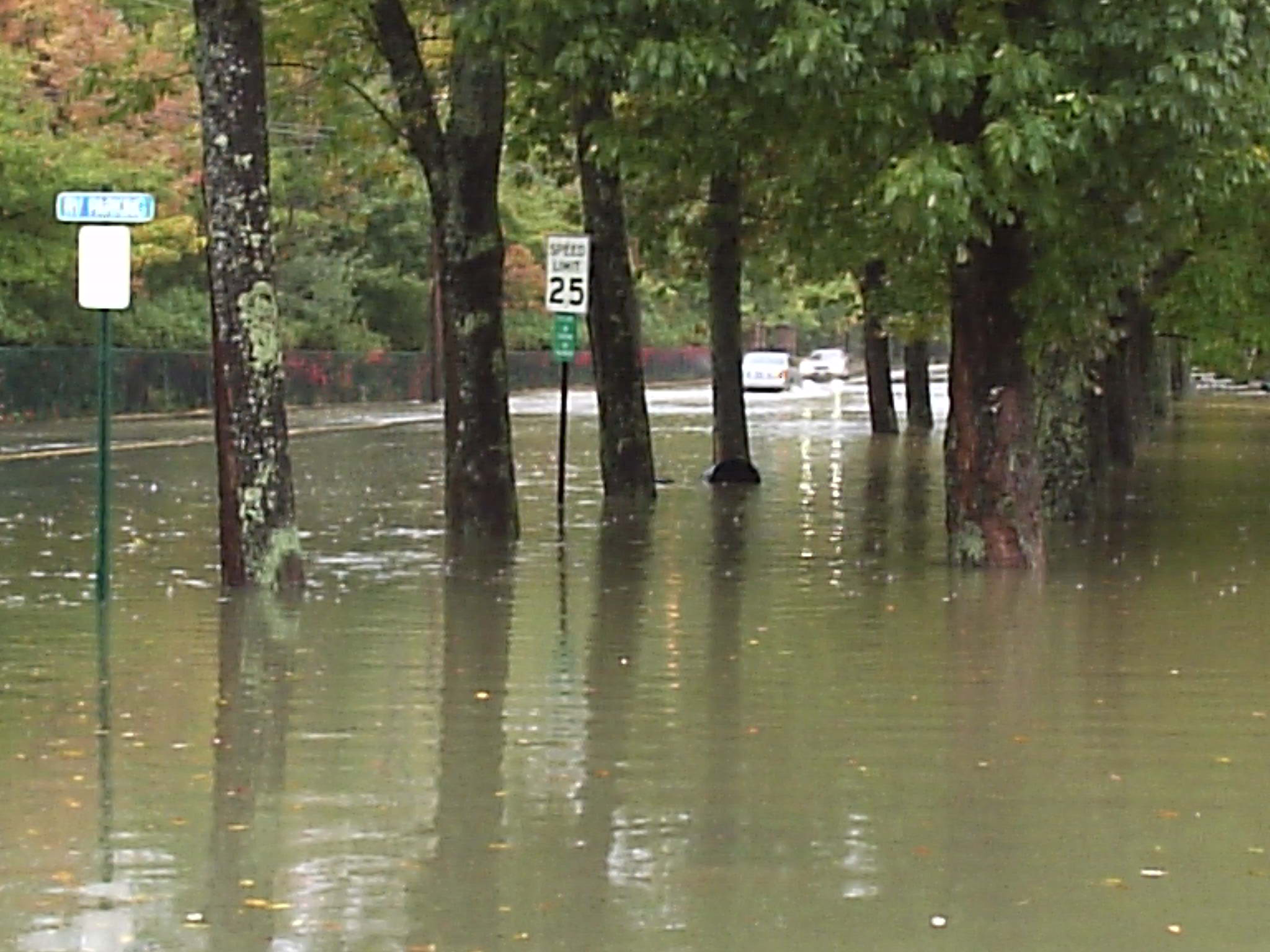
Flooding in Bar Harbor, Maine, from the Northeast U.S. flooding of October 2005

Animation of Hurricane Noel undergoing extratropical transition one day prior to hitting New England

- June 15, 2005 – After being absorbed into a frontal wave, the remnants of Tropical Storm Arlene dropped light rainfall in Northern New England.
- July 8, 2005 – The extratropical remnants of Hurricane Cindy produced moderate rainfall in northern Vermont, generally within the range of 1 to 3 in (25 to 76 mm).
- August 31, 2005 – The remnants of Hurricane Katrina dropped up to 4.17 in (106 mm) of rain and cause gusty winds that blew down trees and tree limbs, primarily across Vermont, New Hampshire, and Massachusetts.
- September 17, 2005 – Hurricane Ophelia brushed Massachusetts with gusty winds and heavy rainfall.
- October 7–12, 2005 – The remnants of Tropical Storm Tammy and Subtropical Depression Twenty-Two (2005) contributed to the Northeast U.S. flooding of October 2005, which killed 10 people and contributed to the wettest month on record in locations throughout the Northeastern United States.
- June 15, 2006 – The extratropical remnants of Tropical Storm Alberto dropped rainfall throughout the region, peaking at 1.98 in (50 mm) at Windsor Locks, Connecticut.
- July 21, 2006 – Tropical Storm Beryl made landfall on Nantucket, generating waves 10 feet (3.0 m) in height as the storm approached the island. Light rainfall and gusty winds were also reported there, and in portions of Massachusetts.
- September 3, 2006 – The extratropical remnants of Hurricane Ernesto dropped light rainfall; 1.72 in (44 mm) of precipitation was reported at Marlboro, Vermont.
- June 4, 2007 – The extratropical remnants of Tropical Storm Barry entered the region, producing moderate rainfall that peaked at 3.2 inches (81 mm) at Taunton, Massachusetts.
- November 3, 2007 – As a powerful extratropical storm, Hurricane Noel hit coastal Massachusetts, Rhode Island and Maine with hurricane-force wind-gusts of up to 89 mph (143 km/h), with sustained winds topping out at 59 mph (95 km/h). Power outages were widespread; about 80,000 customers in Massachusetts, mostly on Cape Cod, and 9,000 in Maine lost electric power. Heavy rainfall, high seas, and coastal flooding also occurred.
- September 6, 2008 – Tropical Storm Hanna made landfall at Myrtle Beach, South Carolina, and proceeded northeastward through the Mid Atlantic states and New England, dropping moderate to heavy rainfall and spawning gusty winds across southern New England.
- September 15, 2008 – The remnants of Hurricane Ike reached northern New England, though no effects were reported.
- September 28, 2008 – Hurricane Kyle passed to the east as it heads towards Canada, affecting Maine with heavy rainfall and gusty winds that caused scattered power outages. Up to 7.15 in (182 mm) of precipitation falls in Hancock County, Maine.
- August 21, 2009 – Hurricane Bill passed just offshore of New England causing very heavy surf, and a period of rain and gusty winds over Southeastern Massachusetts.

Hurricane Irene near its New York landfall. Irene was the deadliest hurricane to hit New England in more than half a century.

- August 29, 2009 – Tropical Storm Danny passed over Nantucket as an extratropical storm, causing up to 2 inches (51 mm) of rain in Massachusetts and Rhode Island, and bringing wind gusts up to 60 mph (97 km/h) off the coast of Nantucket and Maine.
- November 12, 2009 – Hurricane Ida, after hitting the northeast gulf coast as a tropical storm, redeveloped off the Carolina coast as a strong nor'easter, bringing severe damage as far north as New Jersey, where severe flooding, beach erosion, and strong winds were reported. As the center of the storm moved out to sea, a batch of moisture broke off it, and moved north, bringing moderate rain to New England. The storm caused millions of dollars in damage.
- September 4, 2010 – Hurricane Earl passed about 90 miles offshore, but still brought heavy rain, large waves, and tropical storm force gusts to Cape Cod. The heaviest rain affected areas such as Nantucket, Martha's Vineyard, and areas over Maine, while the strongest wind was a recorded gust of 58 mph (93 km/h) near Hyannis, Massachusetts. Sustained winds were of 29 to 35 miles per hour, just at and below tropical storm force.
- August 28, 2011 – Hurricane Irene weakened to a tropical storm just before its landfall in New York, striking with winds of 70 mph (113 km/h). Irene produced high winds, heavy rains, and flash flooding especially in western New England. The storm left at least 16 people dead throughout New England, including ten deaths in Connecticut. The eastern quadrant of Irene remained intact, as that section had never transversed land and moved north-northeast across southern Bristol and Plymouth counties in Massachusetts. Winds at times reached hurricane force from Westport east to Woods Hole on the south coast.
- October 29–30, 2012 – Hurricane Sandy affected Southern New England with its outer bands producing heavy storm surge, winds, and rainfall before the storm's landfall in New Jersey. Sandy devastated the Jersey Shore, New York City, parts of Long Island and the Connecticut and Rhode Island coastlines. Flooding and power outages (roughly nine million customers total) lasted several days, while thousands of trees, telephone poles and traffic light stanchions were snapped. A total of approximately $71.4 billion in property damage was left in Sandy's wake after it made landfall and its center went over Pennsylvania and New York. Sandy killed 5 people in New England (4 in Connecticut and 1 in New Hampshire). To the west, Sandy dumped 2–4 feet (61–122 cm) of snow in the Appalachian Mountain region and flatlands.
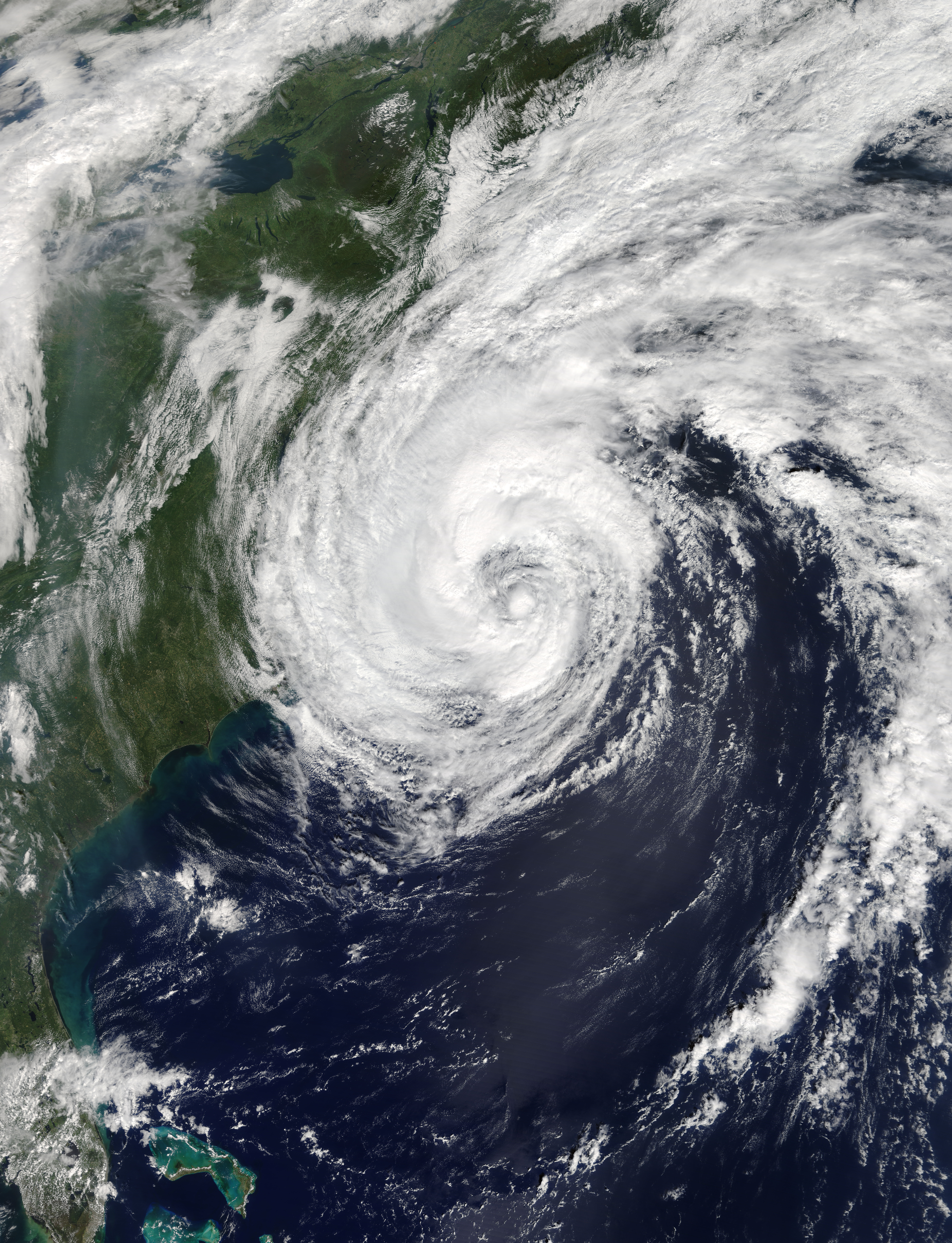
- Tropical Storm Jose south of New England on September 19, 2017.
  October 2–5, 2015 – Hurricane Joaquin, at one point forecast to make a landfall in New England, eventually passed offshore and produced high surf along Cape Cod and Nantucket.
- September 19–22, 2017 – Hurricane Jose stalled to the south of New England, meandering offshore for several days. This resulted in major rainfall and high winds throughout the region, particularly on Cape Cod, Martha's Vineyard, and Nantucket. Rainfall peaked at 6.4 inches (160 mm) on Nantucket, and maximum sustained winds reached 53 mph (90 km/h) miles per hour in Cuttyhunk, with gusts up to 62 mph (100 km/h) recorded on Martha's Vineyard and Nantucket.
- October 29–30, 2017 – The combination of Tropical Storm Philippe and an extratropical system resulted in approximately 1.2 million power outages in New England. The system produced storm-force sustained winds, reaching 57 mph (90 km/h) in Warwick, Rhode Island, and hurricane-force wind gusts, peaking at 93 mph (150 km/h) in Popponesset, Massachusetts. In addition, the system dropped several inches of rain, peaking at 5.5 inches (140 mm) in Canton, Connecticut.
- September 18, 2018 – The remnants of Hurricane Florence passed through the region, resulting in gusty winds and heavy rainfall. A maximum of 7.0 inches (180 mm) of rainfall was recorded in Baldwinville, Massachusetts.
- October 12, 2018 – The remnants of Hurricane Michael passed through southeastern Massachusetts, dropping heavy rainfall throughout the region
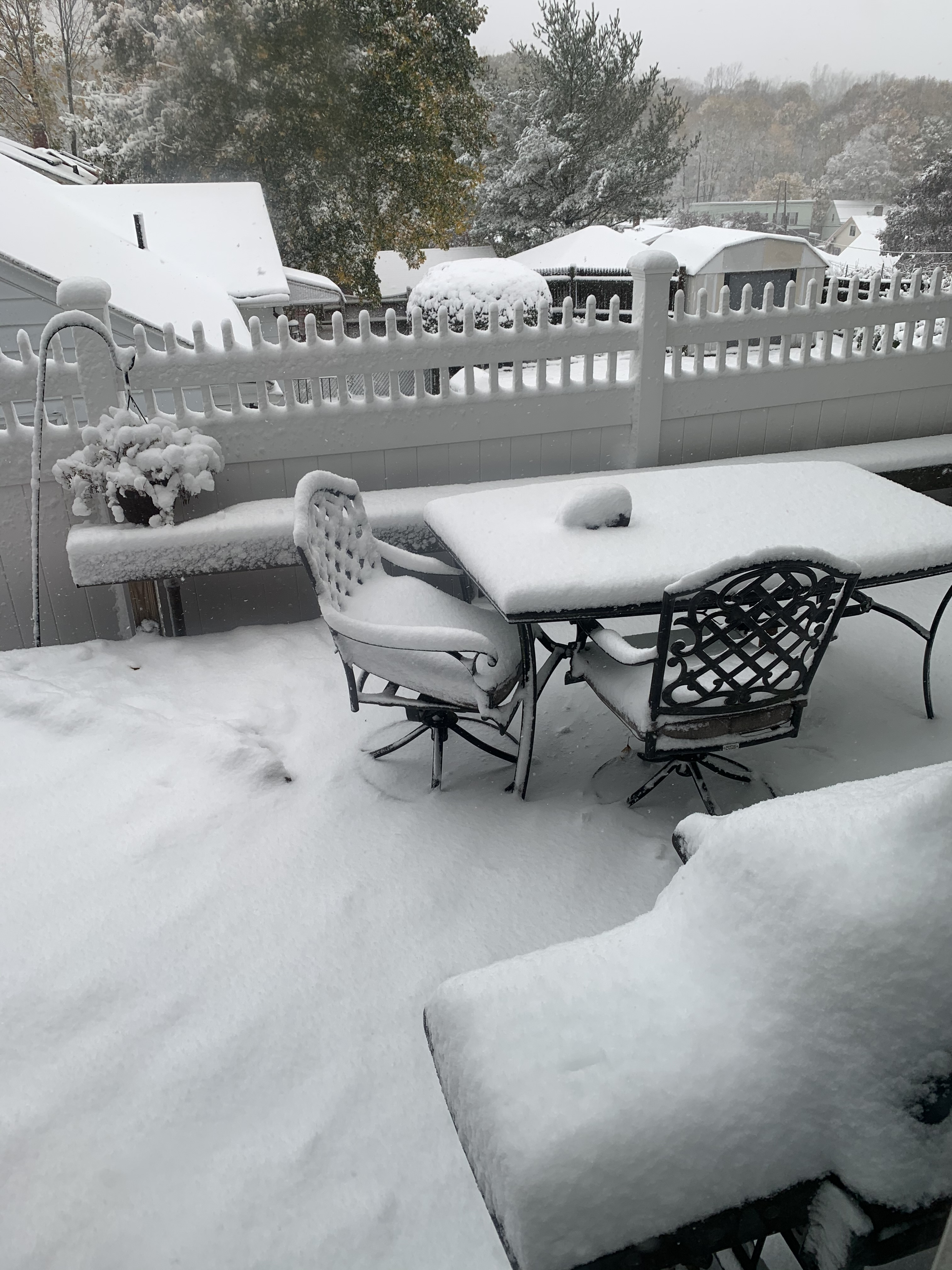
  Snow produced from the remnants of Hurricane Zeta blanketing Eastern Massachusetts on October 30, 2020.
- Early September 2019 – Hurricane Dorian brushed Nantucket, Cape Cod and Martha's Vineyard in eastern Massachusetts; it produced tropical storm force winds and light-to-moderate rain. The storm later brushed southeast Maine as it hit Nova Scotia.
- October 11–13, 2019 – Tropical Storm Melissa brought rainfall, coastal flooding, and strong swells to southeastern New England.
- July 9, 2020 – Tropical Storm Fay made landfall on New Jersey and triggered multiple meteorological warnings for much of New England.
- August 4, 2020 – Tropical Storm Isaias made landfall near North Carolina but maintained tropical storm strength well into New England, causing extensive power outages and tree damage, particularly in Connecticut. The storm became extratropical over Vermont.
- October 30, 2020 – Post-tropical Storm Zeta brought over half a foot of snow accumulation in parts of New England, resulting in power outages, downed trees, and numerous crashes, some serious. Several injuries from crashes were also reported.
- July 8–9, 2021 Hurricane Elsa made landfall in Rhode Island as a tropical storm bringing rain flash flooding and tropical storm force winds to the states of Massachusetts Rhode Island and Connecticut making it the first time since Bob to make landfall in Rhode Island.
- August 22, 2021 – Tropical Storm Henri made landfall near Westerly, Rhode Island, bringing strong winds and heavy rainfall to southern New England, which caused widespread flooding and severe weather. It was the first tropical cyclone to strike Rhode Island since Hurricane Bob in 1991.
- September 1, 2021 - Post-Tropical Cyclone Ida brought deadly flash flooding across Northeastern U.S., including to New England.
- September 6, 2022 - Hurricane Earl caused large surf and rip currents in New England and along the eastern coast of the U.S. while moving into the North Atlantic Ocean.
- September 15, 2023 - Hurricane Lee prompted tropical storm and hurricane warnings and watches, and fisherman hauled in boats and fishing gear. Governor Janet Mills declared a state of emergency for Maine due to the danger of strong winds, flooding, and power outages.
- July 10, 2024 - the remnants of Hurricane Beryl caused flash flooding in New Hampshire and Vermont, causing 2 deaths.
- August 10, 2024 - The remnants of Hurricane Debby led to heavy rains, high winds, and rip currents to New England
- August 17, 2024 - Hurricane Ernesto impacted New England with rip currents and high surf
- August 21–22, 2025 –Hurricane Erin caused minor to moderate coastal flooding from Connecticut to Maine.

== Landfalls ==
A landfall in New England occurs only if the center of the storm comes ashore in Maine, New Hampshire, Massachusetts, Rhode Island, or Connecticut as they all share a coastline. Tropical cyclones that made landfall outside of New England, but subsequently passed through the region, are excluded from this category. For example, the 1893 New York hurricane, Tropical Storm Doria of 1971, and Hurricane Irene of 2011 all made landfall in New York City, but failed to cross Long Island Sound and enter Connecticut along its coastline. In addition, other systems such as the 1876 San Felipe hurricane, 1888 Louisiana hurricane, 1893 Sea Islands hurricane, and Hurricane Able of 1952 all passed through New York, to the north of New York City, before entering New England.

A landfall is also distinct from a direct hit, in which the eyewall, or core of the highest winds, comes onshore, without the center of the storm moving ashore.

New England hurricanes have made landfall on many occasions. Normally, due to cold SSTs and high wind shear, hurricanes do not last long, so the ones that do make landfall are normally weak, with major hurricanes (Category 3 or higher) being rare.

The following tables are a list of all tropical cyclones that have made landfall in New England since records began in 1851:

=== 19th century ===
The 19th century saw a few notable storms. In 1869 an intense Category 3 hurricane struck Southeastern New England. Other hurricanes that made landfall include the Equinoctial Storm, Expedition hurricane, and the Saxby Gale. Since hurricanes were not named and fewer records were kept at the time, the information on some of the storms remains incomplete.

Name	Category		Season	Date of landfall
Name	Peak intensity	Intensity at landfall	Season	Date of landfall
Unnamed	Tropical storm	Tropical storm	1851	October 19, 1851
Unnamed	Category 2	Category 1	1858	September 16, 1858
"Equinoctial"	Category 1	Tropical storm	1861	September 28, 1861
"Expedition"	Category 1	Tropical storm	1861	November 3, 1861
"Great September"	Category 3	Category 3	1869	September 8, 1869
"Saxby"	Category 2	Category 2	1869	October 4, 1869
Unnamed	Category 1	Tropical storm	1872	October 27, 1872
Unnamed	Category 1	Tropical storm	1874	September 30, 1874
Unnamed	Category 3	Category 1	1879	August 19, 1879
Unnamed	Category 1	Category 1	1888	September 26, 1888
Unnamed	Category 2	Tropical storm	1889	September 25, 1889
Unnamed	Category 3	Category 1	1894	October 10, 1894
Unnamed	Category 3	Category 1	1896	September 10, 1896
Unnamed	Tropical storm	Tropical storm	1897	September 24, 1897

=== 20th century ===
The 20th century saw eight hurricanes making landfall in New England; out of these the more notable include the 1938 New England hurricane (also called the Long Island Express), which made landfall as a major hurricane; Hurricane Carol did the same sixteen years later. The last hurricane to make landfall in New England was Hurricane Bob in 1991 as a Category 2 hurricane with maximum sustained winds of 100 mph.

Name	Category		Season	Date of landfall
Name	Peak intensity	Intensity at landfall	Season	Date of landfall
Unnamed	Category 1	Tropical storm	1908	May 30, 1908
Unnamed	Category 2	Tropical storm	1916	July 21, 1916
Unnamed	Tropical storm	Tropical storm	1923	October 19, 1923
Unnamed	Category 2	Tropical storm	1934	September 9, 1934
"New England"	Category 5	Category 3	1938	September 21, 1938
"Great Atlantic"	Category 4	Category 1	1944	September 15, 1944
Carol	Category 3	Category 3	1954	August 31, 1954
Edna	Category 3	Category 2	1954	September 11, 1954
Cindy	Category 1	Tropical storm	1959	July 11, 1959
Brenda	Tropical storm	Tropical storm	1960	July 30, 1960
Donna	Category 4	Category 1	1960	September 12, 1960
Tropical Storm Six	Tropical storm	Tropical storm	1961	September 15, 1961
Esther	Category 5	Tropical storm	1961	September 26, 1961
Heidi	Tropical storm	Tropical storm	1971	September 14, 1971
Belle	Category 3	Tropical storm	1976	August 10, 1976
Gloria	Category 4	Category 1	1985	September 27, 1985
Bob	Category 3	Category 2	1991	August 19, 1991
Bertha	Category 3	Tropical storm	1996	July 13, 1996
Floyd	Category 4	Tropical storm	1999	September 16–17, 1999

=== 21st century ===
So far in the 21st century, five tropical cyclones have made landfall in New England: Tropical Storm Hermine in 2004, which made landfall in southeastern Massachusetts; Tropical Storm Beryl in 2006, which made landfall in Nantucket; Tropical Storm Hanna in 2008, which made landfall in Connecticut; and Tropical Storms Elsa and Henri in 2021, which both made landfall in Rhode Island.

Name	Category		Season	Date of landfall
Name	Peak intensity	Intensity at landfall	Season	Date of landfall
Hermine	Tropical storm	Tropical storm	2004	August 31, 2004
Beryl	Tropical storm	Tropical storm	2006	July 21, 2006
Hanna	Category 1	Tropical storm	2008	September 6, 2008
Elsa	Category 1	Tropical storm	2021	July 9, 2021
Henri	Category 1	Tropical storm	2021	August 22, 2021

== Deadliest storms ==
Some tropical cyclones that have impacted New England have resulted in fatalities in the region. The most notorious and deadly of these storms is the 1938 New England hurricane which killed between 682 and 800 people. This list includes all tropical cyclones that have resulted in at least 10 deaths in New England. Some storms may be excluded or their death toll may be inaccurate due to a lack of available data at the time.

Name	Year	Number of deaths
"New England"	1938	682–800
Unnamed	1849	143
Unnamed	1927	85
Unnamed	1841	81
Carol	1954	68
Unnamed	1778	50–70
"Great Colonial"	1635	46+
Unnamed	1917	41
Unnamed	1815	38+
"Great Atlantic"	1944	28
Unnamed	1878	27
Edna	1954	21
"Snow"	1804	16
Irene	2011	16
"Great September"	1869	12
Dog	1950	12
Bob	1991	12

== See also ==
- Effects of Hurricane Isabel in New York and New England
- Effects of Hurricane Sandy in New England
- List of Canada hurricanes
- List of New Jersey hurricanes
- List of New York hurricanes
