= 1869 Saxby Gale =

Category 2 Atlantic hurricane

Saxby Gale
Meteorological history
- Formed: October 4, 1869
- Dissipated: October 5, 1869

Category 2 hurricane
- 1-minute sustained (SSHWS/NWS)
- Highest winds: 105 mph (165 km/h)
- Lowest pressure: 965 mbar (hPa); 28.50 inHg

Overall effects
- Fatalities: 37+ direct
- Damage: Massachusetts, New Hampshire, Maine, New Brunswick, Nova Scotia, Prince Edward Island
- IBTrACS
- Part of the 1869 Atlantic hurricane season

The Saxby Gale was a tropical cyclone which struck eastern Canada's Bay of Fundy region on the night of October 4–5, 1869. The storm was named for Lieutenant Stephen Martin Saxby, a naval instructor who, based on his astronomical studies, had predicted extremely high tides in the North Atlantic Ocean on October 1, 1869, which would produce storm surges in the event of a storm.

== Effects ==
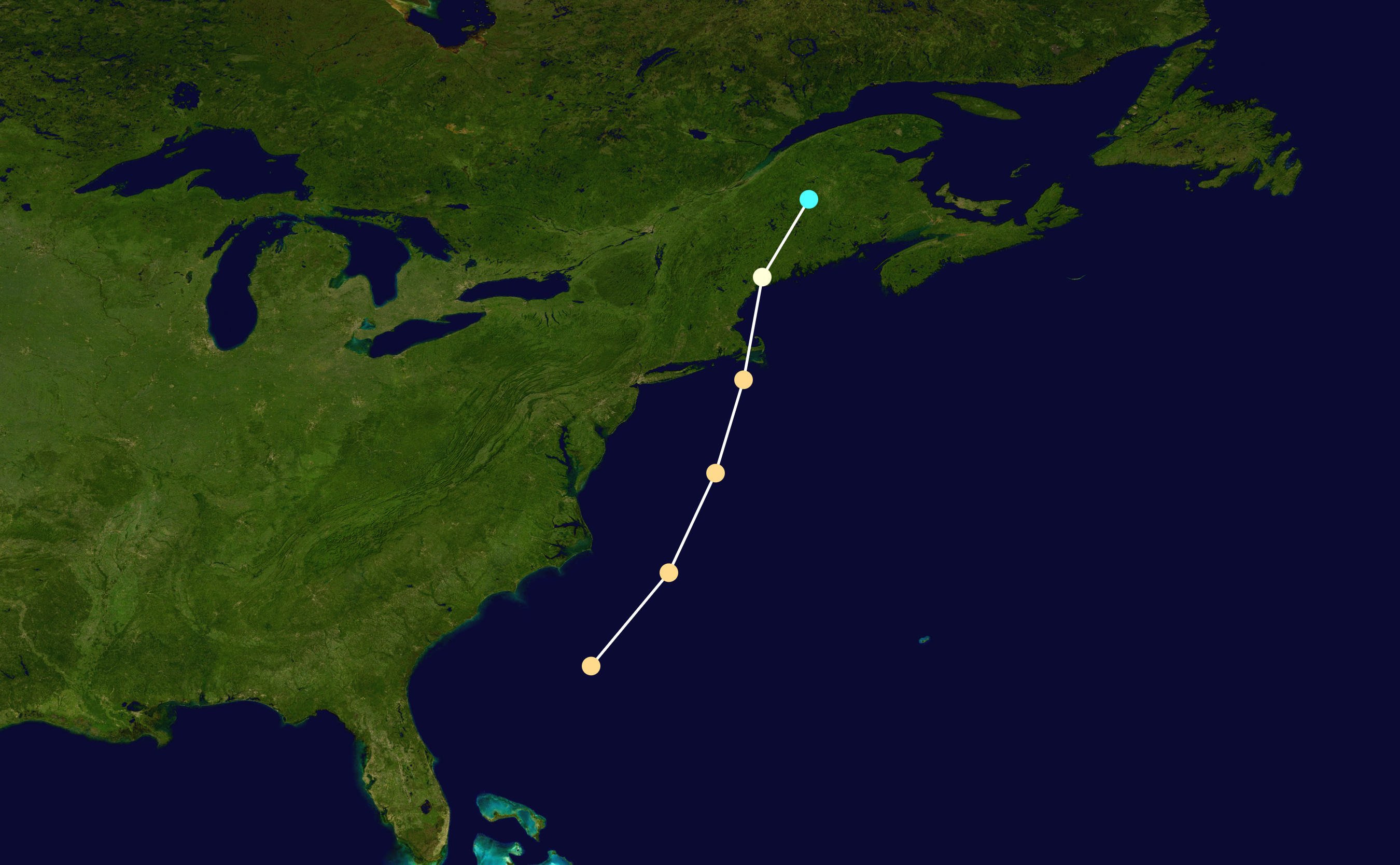
Map plotting the storm's track and intensity, according to the Saffir–Simpson scale Map key Saffir–Simpson scale Tropical depression (≤38 mph, ≤62 km/h) Tropical storm (39–73 mph, 63–118 km/h) Category 1 (74–95 mph, 119–153 km/h) Category 2 (96–110 mph, 154–177 km/h) Category 3 (111–129 mph, 178–208 km/h) Category 4 (130–156 mph, 209–251 km/h) Category 5 (≥157 mph, ≥252 km/h) Unknown Storm type Tropical cyclone Subtropical cyclone Extratropical cyclone, remnant low, tropical disturbance, or monsoon depression

The hurricane caused extensive destruction to port facilities and communities along the Bay of Fundy coast in both New Brunswick and Nova Scotia as well as Maine, particularly Calais, St. Andrews, St. George, Saint John, Moncton, Sackville, Amherst, Windsor and Truro.

Much of the devastation was attributed to a two-metre storm surge created by the storm which coincided with a perigean spring tide; the Bay of Fundy having one of the highest tidal ranges in the world. The Saxby Gale storm surge produced a water level which gave Burntcoat Head, Nova Scotia, the honor of having the highest tidal range ever recorded. It is also thought to have formed the long gravel beach that connects Partridge Island, Nova Scotia, to the mainland.

Deadliest Canada hurricanes
Rank	Hurricane	Season	Fatalities
1	"Newfoundland (1)"	1775	4,000–4,163†
2	"Nova Scotia (1)"	1873	600†
3	"Nova Scotia (3)"	1927	173–192†
4	"Labrador"	1882	140
5	Hazel	1954	81
6	"Newfoundland (2)"	1883	80
7	"Nova Scotia (2)"	1926	55–58†
8	"Galveston"	1900	52–232†
9	"Newfoundland (3)"	1935	50†
10	"Saxby Gale"	1869	37+
† – Estimated total
Source: NOAA

The storm also produced waves which, combined with the storm surge, breached dikes protecting low-lying farmland in the Minas Basin and the Tantramar Marshes, sending ocean waters surging far inland to inundate farms and communities. Sailing ships in various harbors were tossed about and/or broken up against wharves and breakwaters which were also destroyed. Farmers trying to rescue livestock from fields along shorelines drowned after dikes were breached. There were at least 37 deaths between Maine, New Brunswick, and New York. The gale destroyed miles of the newly completed Windsor and Annapolis Railway along the Minas Basin near Horton and Wolfville, Nova Scotia.

== Naming of the storm ==
The storm (which pre-dated the practice of naming hurricanes) was given the name "Saxby" in honor of Lieutenant Stephen Martin Saxby, Royal Navy, who was a naval instructor and amateur astronomer. Lt. Saxby had written a letter of warning, published December 25, 1868, in London's The Standard newspaper in which he notes the astronomical forces predicted for October 5, 1869, which would produce extremely high tides in the North Atlantic Ocean during the height of hurricane season. Lt. Saxby followed this warning with a reminder published on September 16, 1869, to The Standard in which he also warns of a major "atmospheric disturbance" that would coincide with the high water level at an undetermined location. Many newspapers took up Saxby's warning in the coming days.

In a monthly weather column published October 5, 1869, in Halifax's The Evening Express, amateur meteorologist Frederick Allison relayed Lt. Saxby's warning for a devastating storm the following week.

Despite the warning, many readers throughout the United Kingdom, Canada, Newfoundland and the United States dismissed Saxby since there were frequent gales and hurricanes during the month of October. The fact that the high tides occurred throughout the North Atlantic basin was unremarkable and astronomically predictable, except for their coinciding with the hurricane which struck the Gulf of Maine and Bay of Fundy to produce the devastating storm surge. Lt. Saxby's predictions were considered quite lunatic at the time. Some believed that his predictions were founded upon astrology, which was not the case.

=== Letter to the Editor, Dec. 25, 1868 ===
"Coming Weather"

TO THE EDITOR

Sir, – on the 1st June, 1863, you, in your journal, kindly permitted me to offer a special warning as to the period between the 10th and 13th December of that year. After giving my reasons for expecting very serious weather in that December, I said, "Now let any man tell me what other influence can be adduced to coincide for that period so as to increase the chance of our having the most destructive storm and the most dangerous tide with which the earth can without miracle be visited." Well-known and widely-known fulfillments justified this prediction, and those results are my apology for asking permission to acquaint the world through your columns with what threatens, not only us in Great Britain, but all parts of the earth as about to happen in the coming year.

Some of your readers may probably be incredulous as to weather warnings given so long an interval before an expected danger: allow me, therefore, first to give at least one authentic instance of absolute fulfillment (as published by me some time early in 1864).

A stranger to me, Captain Sturley, of Burnhamovery, wrote to me on 2d November, 1863, as follows: – "Observing your letter in the Standard of 1st June," &c., … "would you still advise us to take every precaution against this coming tide?" (I strongly renewed my advice as to the sea walls of the Lincolnshire and Norfolk fens). On 21st December, 1863, he again wrote: – "the tide made its appearance much earlier than usual – at 7:45 (a.m. Sunday 13th), the tide was at its highest, being a very large tide; should we have had a gale from the northwest it would have overflowed all our banks. I think you were perfectly justified in giving warning. I may say your warning has induced a long neglected sea bank to be put in repair."

I need to say no more, except that on the same day (Dec.13) the dock master of the Victoria Dock, London, found 30 feet water on the dock sill, which enabled him to dock the largest merchant ship afloat (The Great Republic), and also the ironclad Monitor (their being an excessive rise of about eight feet).

I now beg leave to the state, with regard to 1869, that at seven a.m., on October 5, the moon will be at that part of her orbit which is nearest to the earth. Her attraction will, therefore, be at its maximum force. At noon of the same day the moon will be on the earth's equator, a circumstance which never occurs without mark atmospheric disturbance, and at two p.m. of the same day lines drawn from the earth center would cut the sun and moon in the same arc of right ascension (the moon's attraction and the sun's attraction will therefore be acting in the same direction); in other words, the new moon will be on the earth's equator when in perigee, and nothing more threatening can, I say, occur without miracle. (The earth, it is true, will not be in perihelion and by some 16 or 17 seconds of semi-diameter.)

With your permission, I will, during September next, for the safety of mariners, briefly reminding your readers of this warning. In the meantime there will be time for the repair of unsafe sea walls, and for the circulation of this notice by means of your far-reaching voice, throughout the wide world.

At the period referred to in 1863 the moon happened to be any extreme south declination, and accordingly the greater devastation occurred in the Southern Hemisphere (e.g. Melbourne – vide The Times of Feb. 13 1864 – the Cape of Good Hope &c.), but next year the two hemispheres will be affected alike.

I am quite aware that in taking this step I am allowing a sense of social duty to outweigh personal considerations; but I accept the consequences. – I have, &c.,

Dec. 21

— S. M. Saxby, The Standard, London, Friday, December 25, 1868. Issue No. 13,851, Page 5, col. 7 (middle)

=== Letter to the Editor, Sept. 16, 1869 ===
"Equinoctal Gales"

TO THE EDITOR

Sir, – I owe every apology before again presumed in to seek a small space in your journal, but I am afraid the general popular attribution of the present serious gales to equinoctial causes may allow the seaman into a dangerous feeling of security when these gales leave us.

We read long and painful lists of casualties from "fearful gales," "fierce jails," "frightful hurricanes," &c., at Padstow, Falmouth, and Weymouth respectively; while a "tale of unparalleled fury" is described as felt at Weston-super-Mare and Boulogne, &c.; so that passing occurrences, taken in connection with my warning of October 5 to 7, are sufficiently serious, if I have not (as some people seem to think I have) mistaken in the period of greatest danger altogether.

I am sorry to say that they present of weather has nothing to do with the equinox : these are not equinoctial gales; they are to come. The mere equinoxes has only power to cause a serious disturbance when it occurs in unison with luni-solar influences. We must remember the present prevailing succession of gales set in a few hours before my marked 6th to 10th inst. (we will say within bounds), more than a fortnight before the equinox actually takes place. Equinoctial gales are the effect of an equinox, which effect must, of course, be preceded by the cause. As well we might expect to hear the report of a gun a fortnight before it is fired, as to have equinoctial gales set in weeks before the sun crosses the equator, late p.m. on the 22nd inst.

Letters to me from the coast manifest considerable anxiety as to October 5th to 7th.

It is a high responsibility, but with my strong convictions, resulting from experience, what am I to do when asked whether I will endeavour, as much as in me lies, to prevent loss of life and property? Can I forget the lives I may in person have assisted to save? Can one ever forget his experiences when, on many occasions, forming one of a lifeboat's crew at the Goodwin?

My suggestions have been thankfully received by those whose lives would soon be periled by disregard of warnings. Fishermen may be induced not to sail for the Dogger Bank without every precaution; pilots and those whose work lies in the English Channel are forewarned and will be forearmed; and, indeed, will be better prepared for the worst if you will kindly permit me, sir, to state again the reason why I expected extreme bad weather in October. It is still imperfectly understood by the multitude.

I discovered some years since that neither the moon nor the sun ever crosses the earth's equator without causing atmospheric disturbance, and especially in the winter months. The disturbance is greatly intensified when the new moon in perigee happens at such periods.

Now, the new moon was in perigee (that is to say, the moon was at the part of her orbit nearest to the earth and is a direct line with the sun), on the 6th instant, thus combining three powers of attraction of the two bodies. About 30 hours afterwards the moon crossed the equator, and hence arose the continuation of atmospheric disturbance (as it always does in similar cases) which often takes so long to subsided. The consequences of this disturbance are interchanges of air currents, to the disturbance of temperature, inducing condensation of vapor, resulting in partial vacuums, which the rushing in of air tends to equilibrate; hence we have in and from these, gales and showers of a strength and quantity perfectly inestimable, except from comparisons.

Now between the two causes referred to and a third cause of disturbance there was, I say, an interval of about 30 hours; but in October next all three corresponding causes will occur within a space of seven hours – i.e. perigee on the 5th at 7 a.m., lunar equinox at noon, and new moon at 2 p.m.. So that even from these causes alone ought to expect in October increased disturbance; but this will furthermore be intensified by the circumstances of the sun's being nearer to us in October that it was on the 7th September by at least eight seconds of parallax, or about one quarter of his whole yearly change of distance.

Therefore, one is justified in expecting (to say the least) quite as great an atmospheric disturbance early in October as we have had since 6th inst.; and I am sorry to say the same may be expected with equal uncertainty and intensity on the 1st to 3rd November next. The warnings apply to all parts of the world; effects may be felt more in some places that in others. It is painful to have to forebode evil; but better thus than to merit self-reproach under circumstances which might lead to permanent regrets. Could I save one life, it would be very cheaply purchased in making better known certain laws of nature. – I have the honor to be Sir, your obedient servant,

Faversham, Sept. 14.

— S. M. Saxby, The Standard, London, England. Thursday, September 16, 1869. Issue No. 14,078, Page 2, col. 7 (middle)

=== Op-Ed Column, Oct. 1, 1869 ===
Halifax, 30th September 1869

Gentlemen:

My attention has been drawn to a letter of Capt. Saxby, R.N., to the Standard of London in which a remarkable atmospheric disturbance is predicted for the coming 5th of October, as the result of the relative positions of the Earth, the Sun, and the Moon, on that day. It may be remembered that a similar prediction of weather likely to occur about the same period, based on similar reasoning, was given to the world some months ago, by an observer in one of the West Indian Islands. Other calculations from district sources point to like conclusions. I have been asked my opinion with regard to these forecasts; and would thus state it publicly, in the hope of doing some good.

I believe that a heavy gale will be encountered here on Tuesday next, the 5th Oct., beginning perhaps on Monday night, possibly deferred as late this Tuesday night; but between those two periods it seems inevitable. At its greatest force the direction of the wind should be South West; having commenced at or near South. Should Monday, the 4th, be a warm day for the season, an additional guarantee of the coming storm will be given. Roughly speaking, the warmer it may be on the 4th, the more violent will be the succeeding storm. Apart from the theory of the moon's attraction, as applied to meteorology, – which is disbelief by many – the experience of any careful observer teaches him to look for a storm at next new moon; and the state of the atmosphere, and consequent weather lately, appears to be leading directly not only to this blow next week, but to a succession of gales during next month. Telegrams from points to the South West of us might give notice of the approach of this storm, and I trust this warning will not be unheeded.

— F. Allison, The Evening Express, Halifax, Nova Scotia. Friday, October 1, 1869, p. 2, col. 3

== See also ==
- List of hurricanes in Canada
- List of New England hurricanes
