= Stephen Martin Saxby =

British naval instructor and amateur meteorologist (1804–1883)

Stephen Martin Saxby (21 August 1804 – 11 March 1883) was a British practitioner of a form of meteorological astrology or Pseudo Meteorology in the Victorian Era. Through his calculations he predicted an 1869 storm called the Saxby Gale. Saxby also published a book in 1864 called the Saxby Weather system that taught his methods of Astrological Meteorology. He also distributed lists of days when atmospheric disturbances would occur that were given to sailors of that era so they could anticipate approaching storms. Saxby's Astrological Meteorological methods have inspired others who predict weather using astrology including Ken Ring of New Zealand.

== Biography ==
Saxby was born in Kent. He attended Gonville and Caius College, Cambridge. He was a lieutenant in the British Royal Navy and lectured on HMS Worcester.

Saxby was an instructor of steam engineers and inventor the "spherograph" for correcting the compass, which he offered to ships. He taught at the Steam Reserve College in Greenwich. Saxby published his weather predictions in the Nautical Magazine, a journal for the merchant marine. He tried to get the attention of the Government Meteorological Department. The Astronomer Royal told Saxby to drop his investigations. In 1861, Saxby sent weather warnings to the marine insurers at Lloyd's of London.

Saxby also tried to interest Robert Fitzroy of the British Meteorological Office. The method of Lunar forecasting was not acceptable to the authorities of the Victorian era.

== Saxby Weather System ==
The Weather System was a book published by Saxby in 1864 outlining his theories. The position of the moon indicates when there will be atmospheric disturbances according to his theory. The phase of the moon its proximity to earth and hemispheric location indicated change days when the weather might change. If the phase, position and hemispheric location aligned then a large storm might occur somewhere in the world. Although Saxby could not predict where the storm would occur. Saxby published lists of days when atmospheric disturbances would occur. These lists were given to sailors. Sailors in some parts of the world claimed his methods seemed to work at sea in some latitudes. In the second edition of the book Saxby provided arguments against Robert FitzRoy's debunking of lunar weather forecasting.

== Saxby Gale ==
Saxby predicted a storm which occurred on 5 October 1869 in Eastern Canada. Today the storm is known as the Saxby Gale.
