= 1866 Atlantic hurricane season =

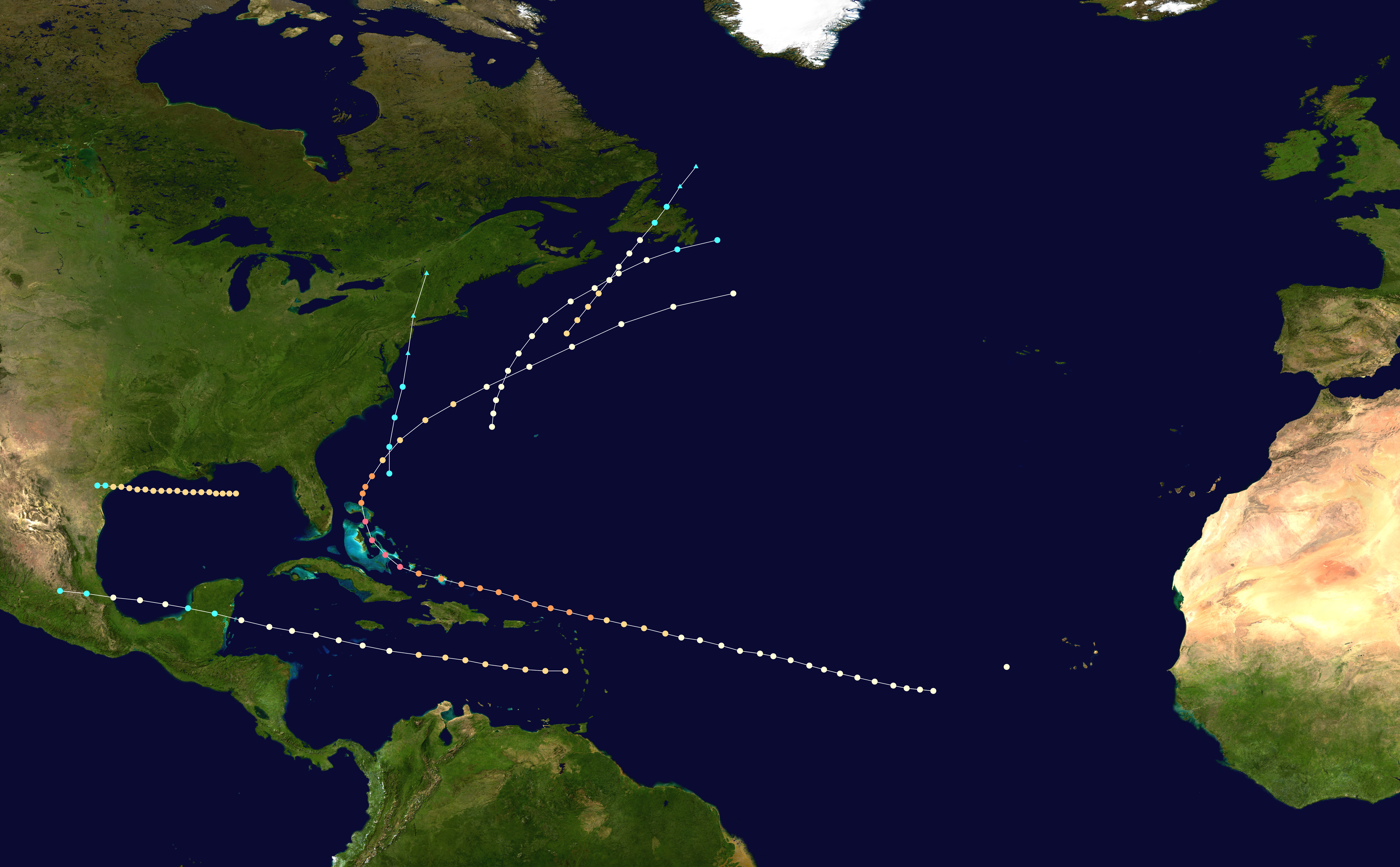
- Season summary map

Seasonal boundaries
- First system formed: July 11, 1866
- Last system dissipated: October 30, 1866

Strongest storm
- Name: Six
  - Maximum winds: 140 mph (220 km/h) (1-minute sustained)
  - Lowest pressure: 938 mbar (hPa; 27.7 inHg)

Seasonal statistics
- Total depressions: 7
- Total storms: 7
- Hurricanes: 6
- Major hurricanes (Cat. 3+): 1
- Total fatalities: 391
- Total damage: Unknown

The 1866 Atlantic hurricane season was originally one of only four Atlantic hurricane seasons in which every known tropical cyclone attained hurricane status, along with 1852, 1858, and 1884. Initially, there were three known storms during the season, but a re-analysis confirmed the increased activity. There were also two other systems that were included as tropical cyclones at one time, although both were considered to have been other storms already in the database. All tropical activity occurred between the middle of July and the end of October. There may have been additional unconfirmed tropical cyclones during the season. Meteorologist Christopher Landsea estimates that up to six storms were missed from the official database, due to small tropical cyclone size, sparse ship reports, and relatively unpopulated coastlines.

Every storm but the fourth hurricane affected land during the season. The first hurricane hit Matagorda, Texas in July, the only one of the season to hit the United States as a hurricane. A month later a hurricane made two landfalls in Mexico. The third hurricane of the season formed near Bermuda and was last observed along the southern coast of Newfoundland. A few weeks later another storm executed a similar track, although it struck Newfoundland as a hurricane and caused damage. The most notable storm of the season was the Great Nassau Hurricane, which killed at least 383 people in the Turks and Caicos, Bahamas, and the western Atlantic Ocean. It attained winds of 140 mph (220 km/h), which is a Category 4 on the modern-day Saffir-Simpson Hurricane Scale. The final hurricane developed over the Bahamas and later struck New Jersey, producing strong winds and high tides across New England.

== Systems ==
=== Hurricane One ===
- Category 2 hurricane (SSHWS)
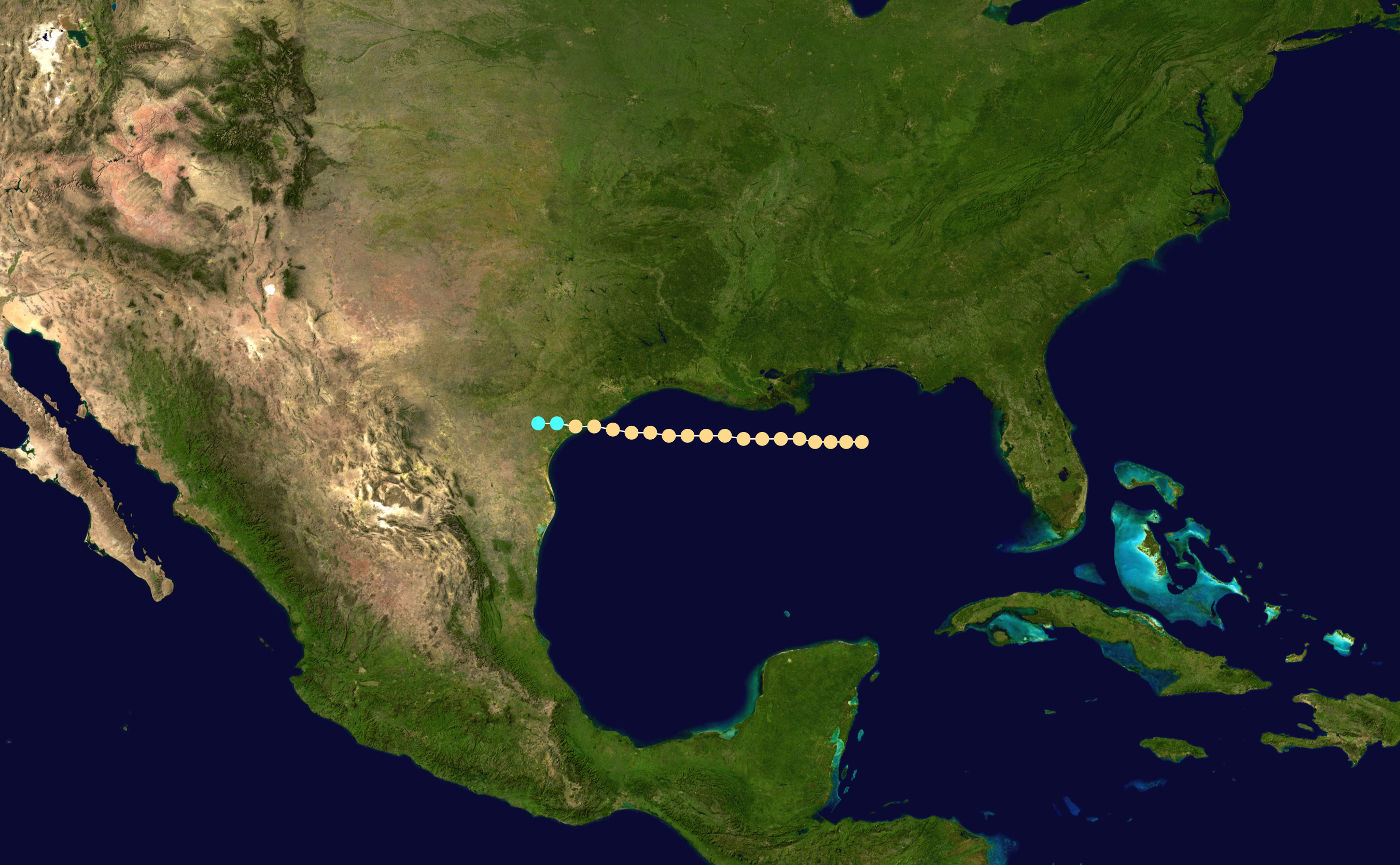
- Duration: July 11 – July 16
- Peak intensity: 105 mph (165 km/h) (1-min); 969 mbar (hPa)

The first hurricane of the season was observed on July 11, when a schooner encountered heavy seas to the south of the Florida Panhandle. As the hurricane moved westward, it remained a short distance off the Gulf Coast of the United States, bringing strong winds to New Orleans on July 12. High tides surrounded the lighthouse at Timbalier Bay for about 24 hours, prompting the lighthouse keeper to resign from loneliness and from fear of the weather.

On July 15, the hurricane moved ashore near Matagorda Bay in Texas, with winds estimated around 105 mph (165 km/h), or a Category 2 on the Saffir-Simpson scale. At landfall, the minimum barometric pressure was estimated at 969 mbar (28.61 inHg). The hurricane's strong winds broke all of the boats from their moorings in the Matagorda harbor. Four ships were either lost or wrecked, and one schooner was washed ashore. The storm dissipated early on July 16 after progressing further inland.

=== Hurricane Two ===
- Category 2 hurricane (SSHWS)
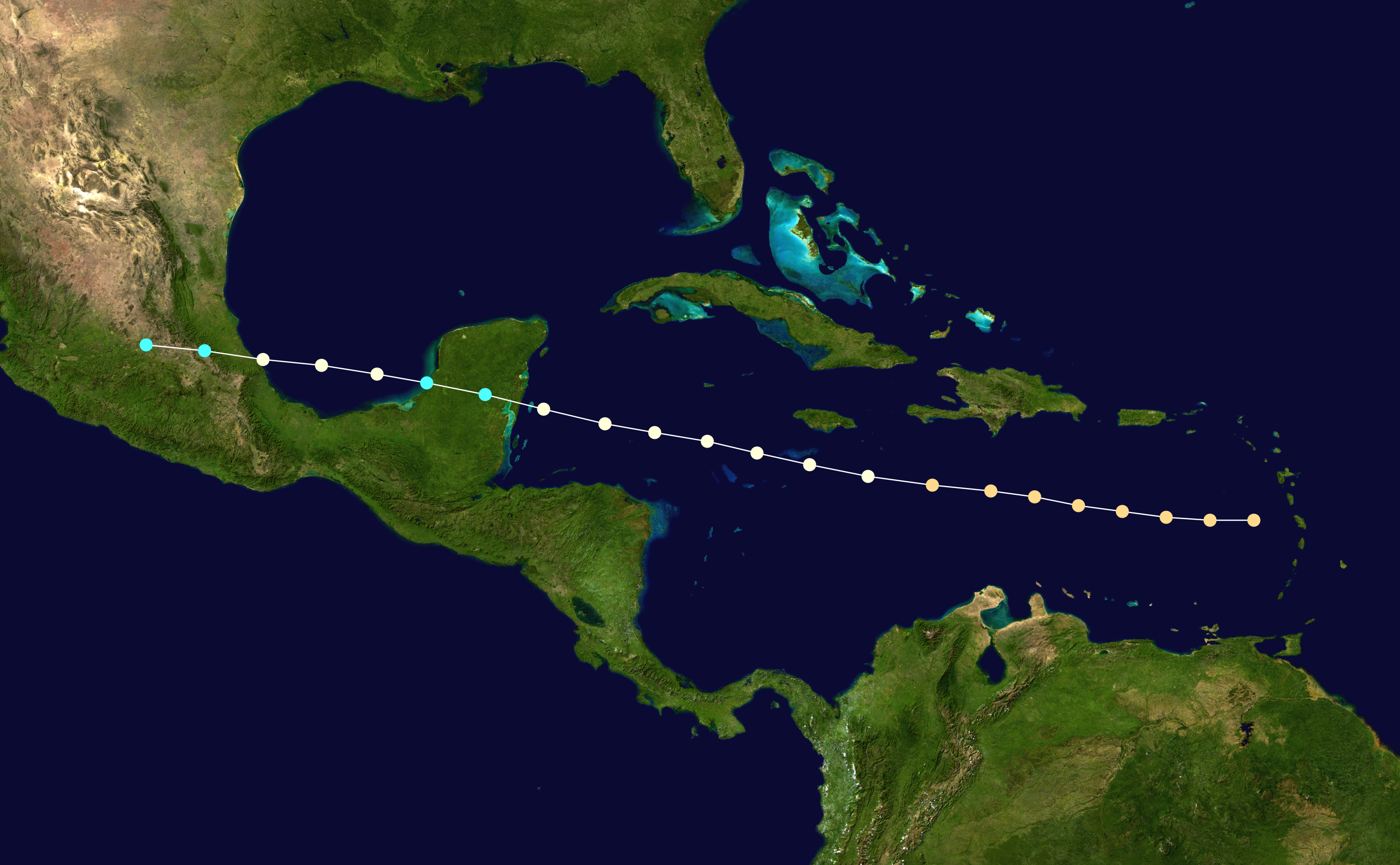
- Duration: August 13 – August 18
- Peak intensity: 105 mph (165 km/h) (1-min);

On August 13, a ship encountered a severe hurricane in the eastern Caribbean Sea. Based on observations, it is estimated the hurricane attained winds of 105 mph (165 km/h). There were no reports for several days, although based on continuity it is estimated the storm passed south of Jamaica on August 15. The following day, the hurricane struck the eastern Yucatán Peninsula, washing seven boats ashore. It is estimated to have weakened to a tropical storm while moving over land, although the system re-intensified into a hurricane in the Bay of Campeche. It made its second and final landfall near Veracruz before dissipating on August 18.

=== Hurricane Three ===
- Category 1 hurricane (SSHWS)
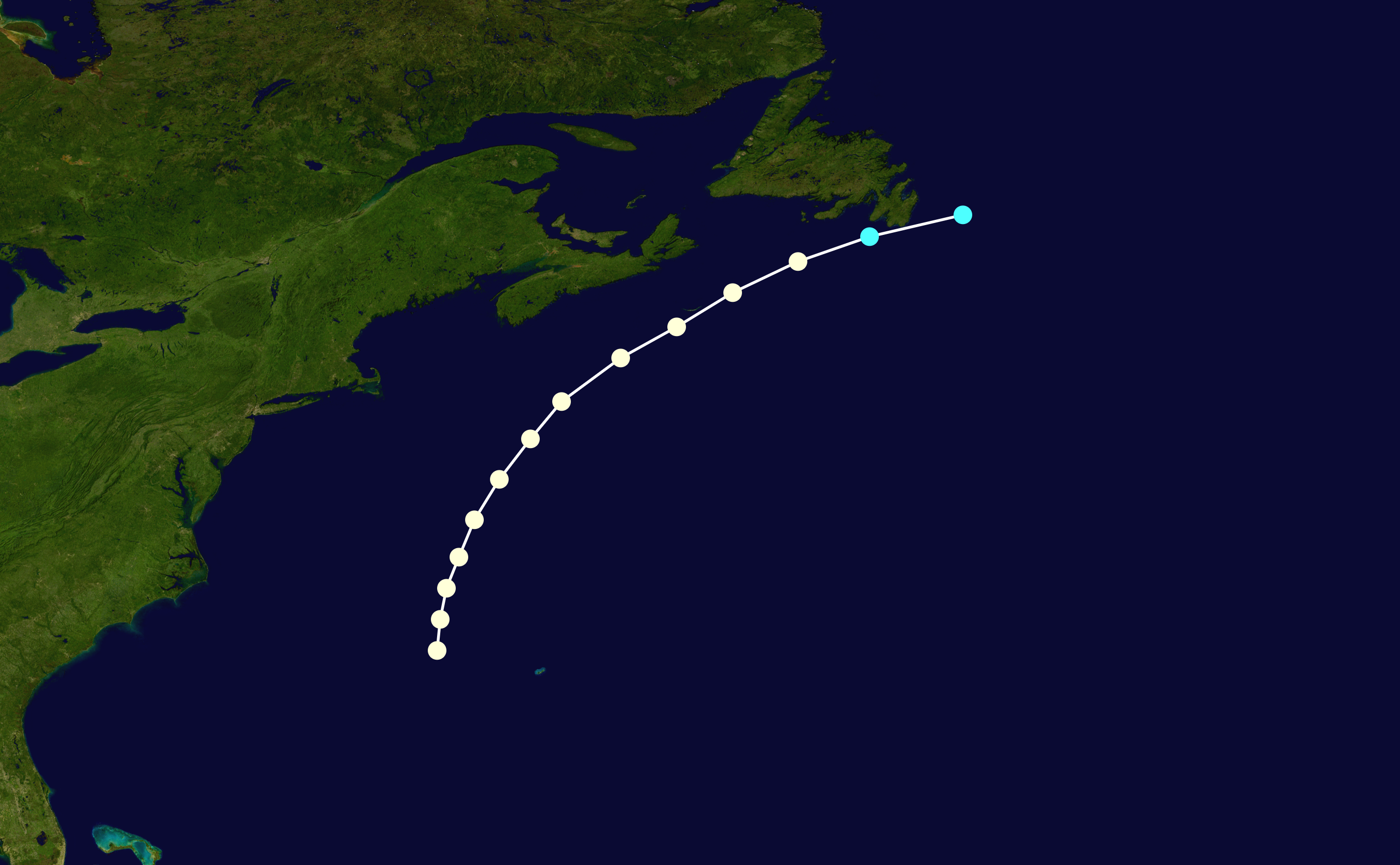
- Duration: September 4 – September 7
- Peak intensity: 80 mph (130 km/h) (1-min);

The third hurricane of the season was first encountered on September 4 by a ship 200 mi (320 km) north of Bermuda; the vessel sustained damage to its foretopmast. The storm affected another ship later that day, leaving similar heavy damage. Tracking generally northeastward, the hurricane was last observed on September 7 near Newfoundland.

=== Hurricane Four ===
- Category 1 hurricane (SSHWS)
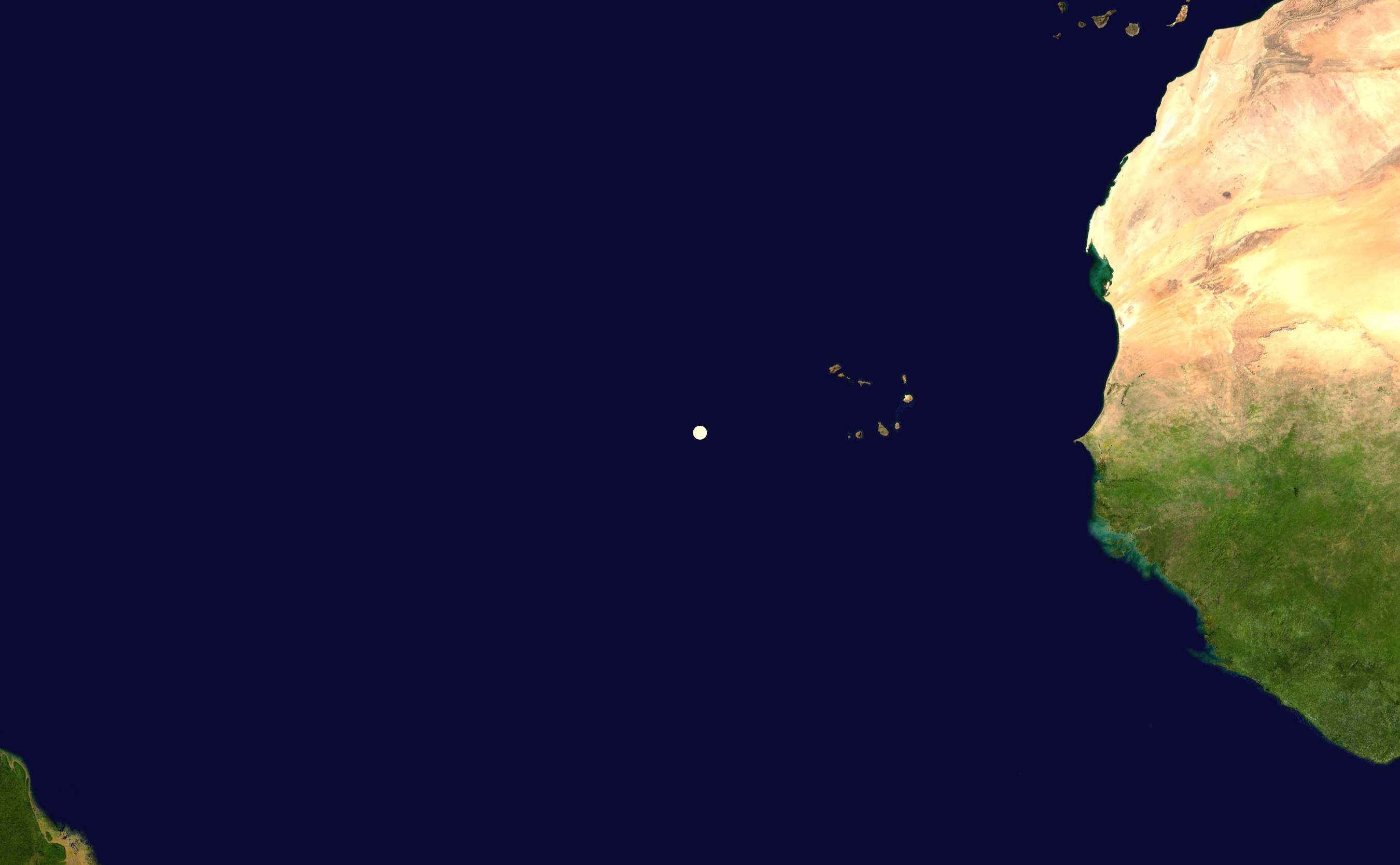
- Duration: September 18 – September 18
- Peak intensity: 80 mph (130 km/h) (1-min);

On September 18 and for two days subsequently, a barque sailed through a hurricane near the Cape Verde islands. The vessel was en route from New York to Shanghai, but due to a leak from the storm it had to return to New York for repairs. Aside from a single reported location, the track of the hurricane is unknown. Winds were estimated around 80 mph (130 km/h).

=== Hurricane Five ===
- Category 2 hurricane (SSHWS)
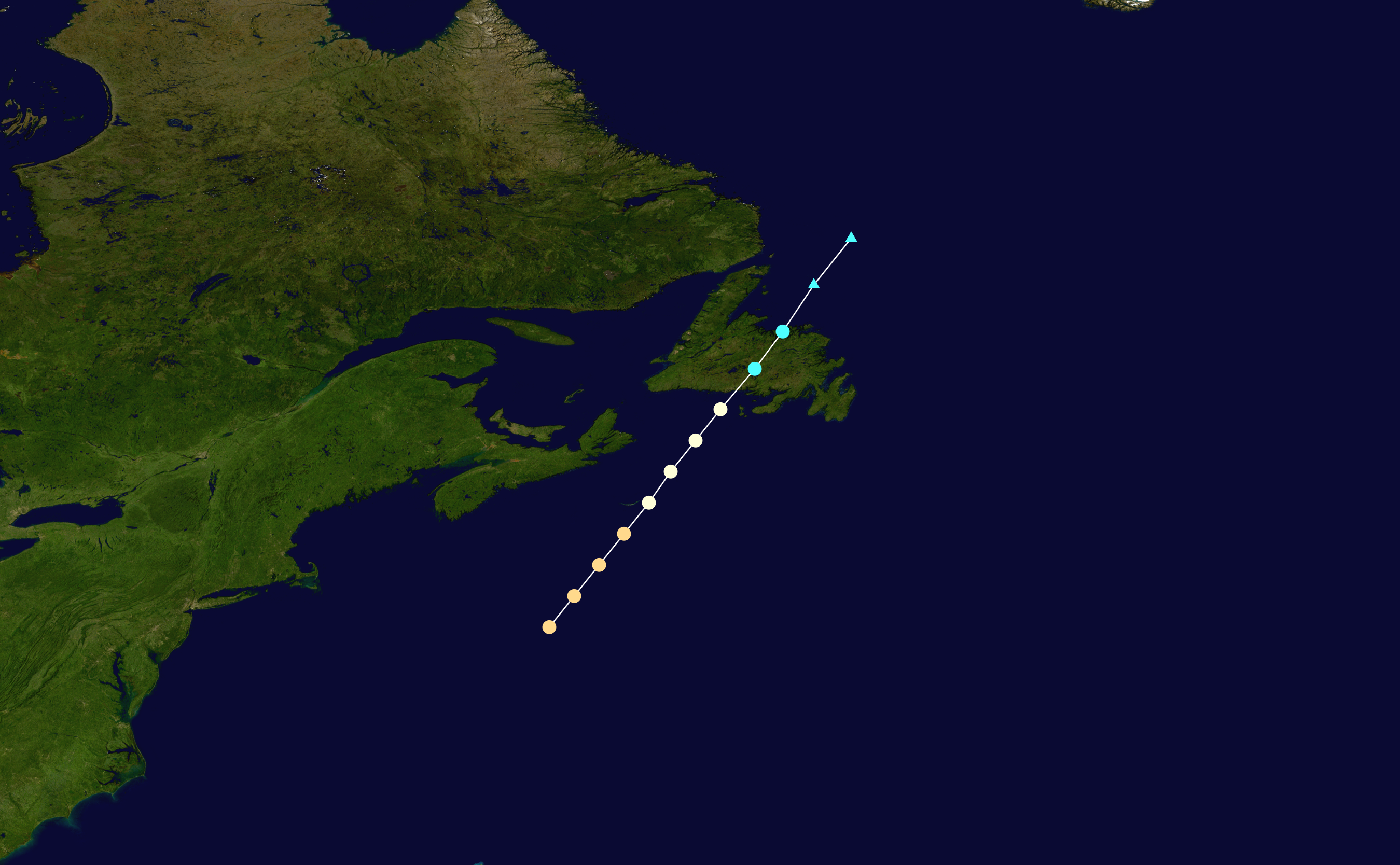
- Duration: September 22 – September 24
- Peak intensity: 105 mph (165 km/h) (1-min);

A ship named "Honduras" observed the fifth hurricane of the season on September 22 to the south-southeast of Nova Scotia. The ship lost its masts and sails from the storm, and based on the observations the winds were estimated around 105 mph (165 km/h). Additional ship reports indicated the hurricane maintained a northeast track toward Newfoundland. Late on September 23, the hurricane made landfall in south-central Newfoundland, although it quickly weakened to tropical storm intensity. The winds spread across much of the island, severing the telegraphs in and around St. John's. Late on September 24, the storm was last observed to the north of the island.

Around August 14, the emigrant bark Laura left Bremen en route to Baltimore, Maryland. According to a contemporary account in The Baltimore Sun, "She reports having encountered a hurricane on the 22d September, shipping a tremendous sea, which washed overboard seven passengers and one of the crew, besides slightly injuring fifty others."

=== Hurricane Six ===
- Category 4 hurricane (SSHWS)
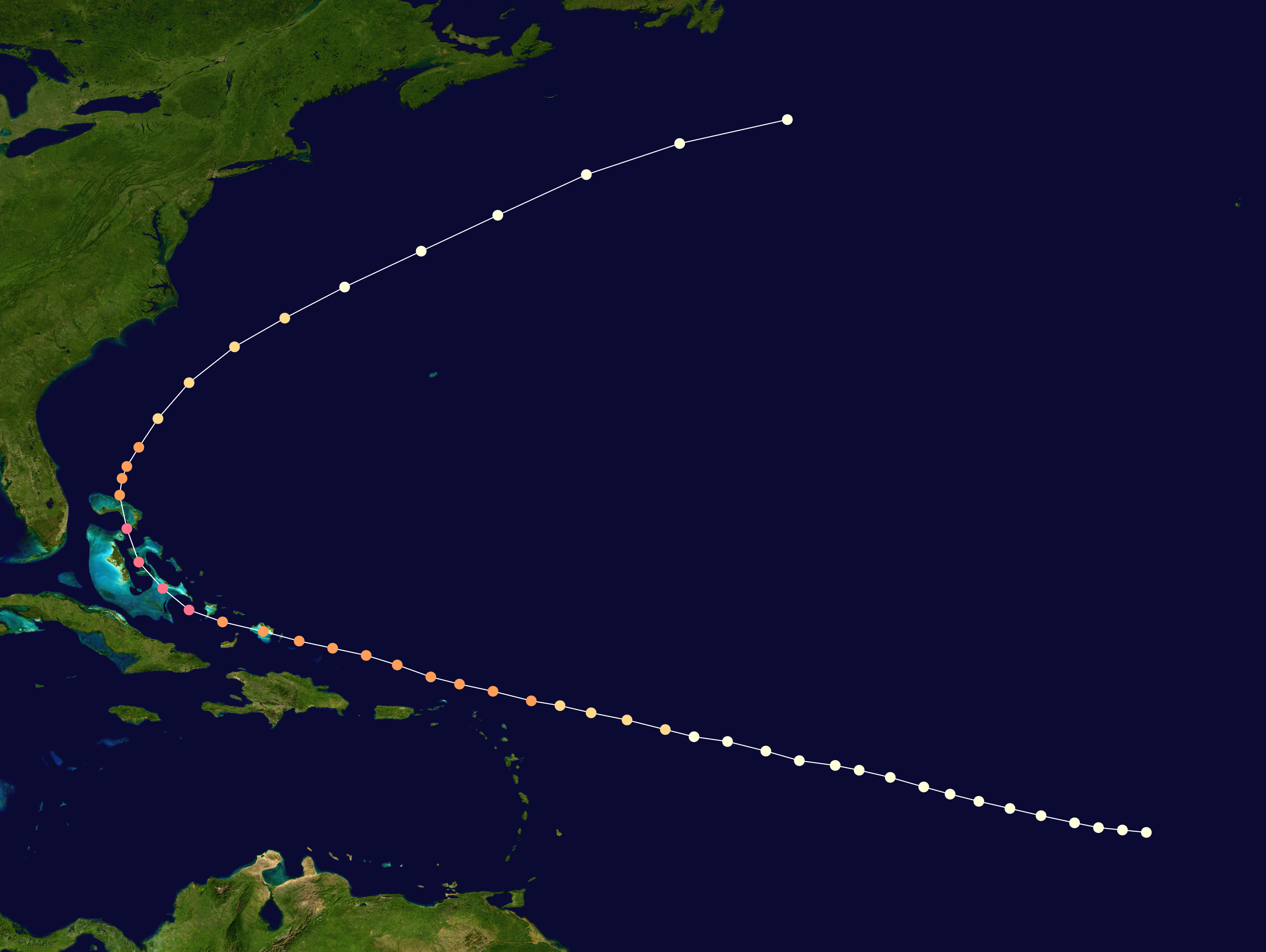
- Duration: September 24 – October 5
- Peak intensity: 140 mph (220 km/h) (1-min); 938 mbar (hPa)

The Great Nassau Hurricane of 1866 or The Great Bahamas Hurricane of 1866 was the sixth hurricane of the season and was also the longest-lasting. The brig Jarien encountered the hurricane on September 24 to the west-southwest of the Cape Verde islands. The track is unknown for the following five days, until another ship reported a hurricane about 20 miles (32 km) north of Anegada in the British Virgin Islands. The hurricane affected the Leeward Islands, washing several ships ashore and destroying a pier in St. Thomas. On September 30 through the following day, the cyclone moved through the Turks and Caicos Islands, becoming what was considered "one of the most terrific hurricanes ever known". About 75% of the population was left homeless and moneyless.

After affecting the Turks and Caicos Islands, the hurricane passed through Eleuthera in the Bahamas where “the brig John Drew of Nova Scotia was overtaken halfway between Harbor Island and Spanish Wells." All but two of the passengers and crew were lost: John Ridley and his daughter, Bessie, were rescued and resuscitated by the island occupants who discovered them. The eye then crossed over Nassau, where a barometric pressure of 938 mbar (27.70 inHg) was reported. Based on this observation, the hurricane is estimated to have had sustained winds of 140 mph (220 km/h). The hurricane struck without warning in the Bahamas, either washing ashore or sinking every ship but one in Nassau. In addition, strong winds downed trees and destroyed roofs. Every building in Nassau was damaged or destroyed. After moving through the islands, the hurricane curved northeastward, affecting dozens of other ships and wrecking four. On October 4, it passed north of Bermuda, where it produced Force 11 winds on the Beaufort scale. The hurricane was last observed on October 5 to the southeast of Atlantic Canada. Along its path through the Turks and Caicos, the Bahamas, and the western Atlantic, the hurricane killed at least 383 people, making it among the 100 deadliest Atlantic hurricanes.

=== Tropical Storm Seven ===
- Tropical storm (SSHWS)
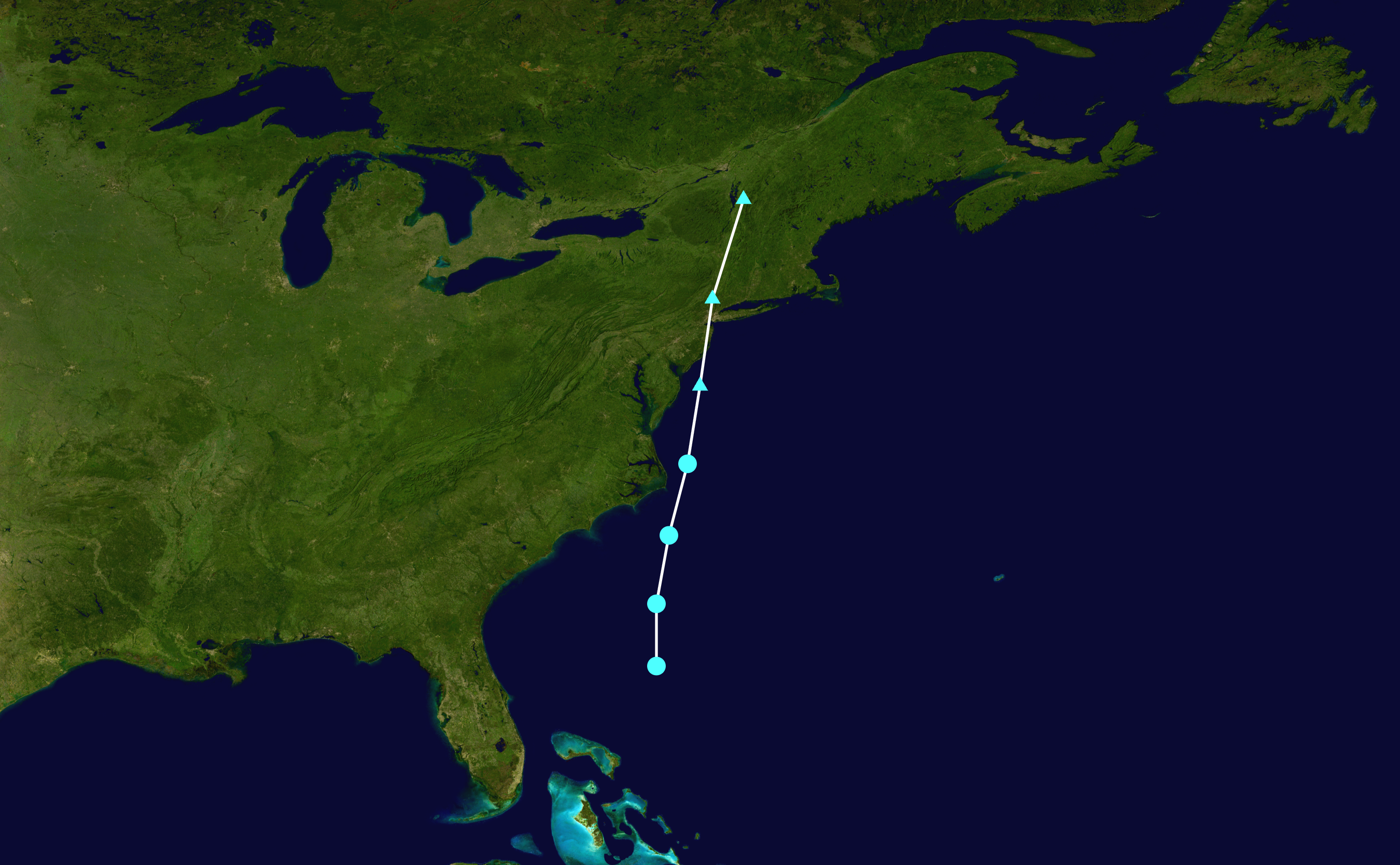
- Duration: October 29 – October 30
- Peak intensity: 70 mph (110 km/h) (1-min);

The final storm of the season was first observed on October 28 over the Bahamas, and may have been a hybrid or subtropical cyclone. It moved north-northwestward through the island chain, followed by a turn to the north-northeast over the western Atlantic. Several ships encountered the tropical storm, and one lost their supply of molasses. On October 30, the cyclone, at the time transitioning to extratropical, struck on the southern end of Long Beach Island with winds of 70 mph (110 km/h). As it moved through the northeastern United States, the storm dropped heavy rainfall, causing flooding near Jersey City and Hoboken, New Jersey. In Brooklyn, the storm moved the rail cars off their tracks, while in Providence, Rhode Island the winds destroyed three buildings and wrecked the roofs of two others. Further northeast, the storm disrupted shipping and cut telegraph lines, although no fatalities were reported. The post-tropical storm was last observed over Vermont late on October 30.

== See also ==
- Atlantic hurricane
- Atlantic hurricane reanalysis project
- Tropical cyclone observation
