= 1852 Atlantic hurricane season =

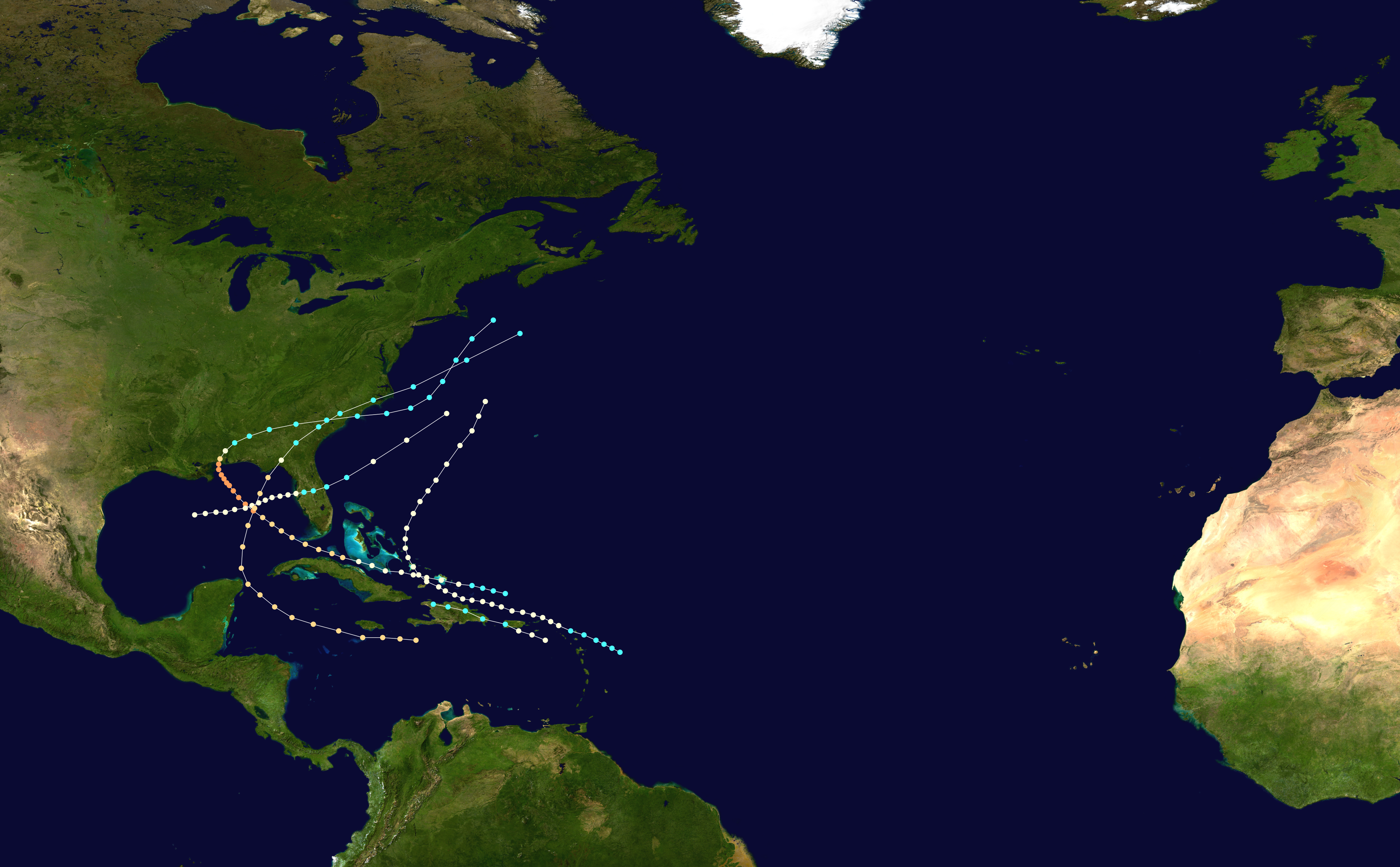
- Season summary map

Seasonal boundaries
- First system formed: August 19, 1852
- Last system dissipated: October 11, 1852

Strongest storm
- Name: One
  - Maximum winds: 115 mph (185 km/h) (1-minute sustained)
  - Lowest pressure: 961 mbar (hPa; 28.38 inHg)

Seasonal statistics
- Total storms: 5
- Hurricanes: 5
- Major hurricanes (Cat. 3+): 1
- Total fatalities: 100+ direct
- Total damage: $1 million (1852 USD)

The 1852 Atlantic hurricane season was the first of only three Atlantic hurricane seasons in which every known tropical cyclone attained hurricane status, preceding 1858 and 1884. Five tropical cyclones were reported during the season, which lasted from late August to the middle of October. These dates fall within the range of most Atlantic tropical cyclone activity, and none of the storms coexisted with another. Though there were officially five tropical cyclones in the season, hurricane scholar Michael Chenoweth assessed two of the cyclones as being the same storm. There may have been other unconfirmed tropical cyclones during the season, as meteorologist Christopher Landsea estimated that up to six storms were missed each year from the official database. This is unusual due to tropical cyclones being smaller than average, sparse ship reports, and relatively unpopulated coastlines at the time.

== Season summary ==
Every tropical cyclone of the season reached hurricane status, which are winds at or exceeding 74 mph (119 km/h). This has only occurred two other times, during the seasons of 1858 and 1884. All five cyclones also affected land; the strongest was the first storm, which caused severe damage and loss of life when it made landfall near the border between Mississippi and Alabama. The second storm of the season struck Puerto Rico, where it caused over 100 deaths, primarily from flooding. In the middle of September, the third storm moved across Florida with strong wind gusts and light rainfall, and a week later the fourth storm passed over or north of the Lesser and Greater Antilles. The last storm hit the Florida Panhandle, though damage was less than expected.

== Systems ==
=== Hurricane One ===
- Category 3 hurricane (SSHWS)
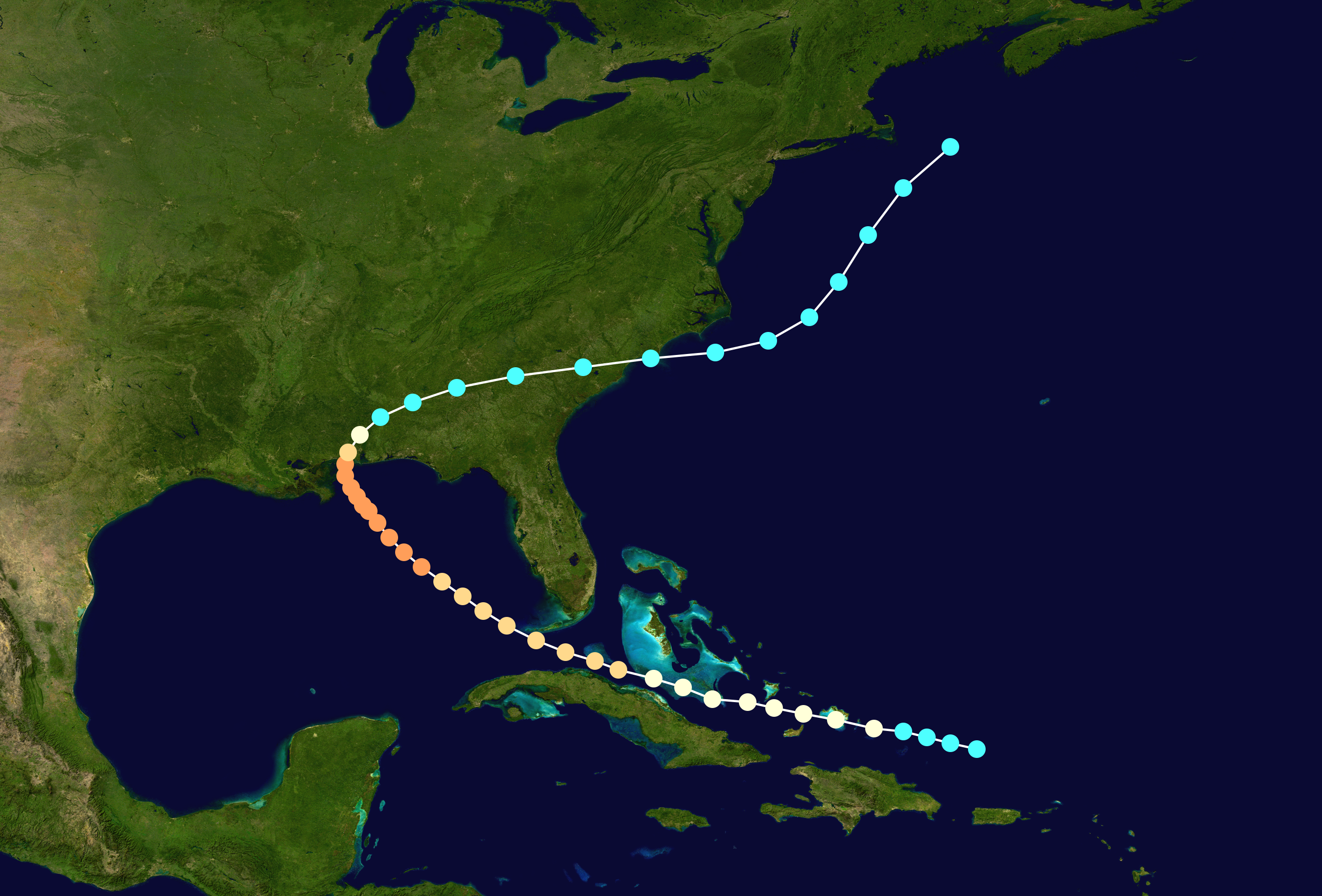
- Duration: August 19 – August 30
- Peak intensity: 115 mph (185 km/h) (1-min); 961 mbar (hPa)

The Great Mobile Hurricane of 1852 was the first tropical cyclone of the year. It was first observed on August 19 about 140 mi (225 km) north of Puerto Rico. It moved on a west-northwest motion before passing through the Bahamas as it attained hurricane status on August 20. After paralleling the northern coast of Cuba, the storm passed between the Dry Tortugas and Key West, Florida on August 22, and two days later it is estimated the hurricane attained peak winds of 115 mph (185 km/h). The storm slowed on August 25 before turning northward, and early on August 26 it made landfall near Pascagoula, Mississippi at peak strength, and the hurricane rapidly weakened to tropical storm status as it accelerated east-northeastward. On August 28 it emerged into the Atlantic Ocean from South Carolina, and after turning to the northeast, it was last observed on August 30 about 130 mi (210 km) southeast of Cape Cod.

In the Florida Keys, rough waves forced several ships ashore, leaving some damaged. Strong waves created four new channels in the Chandeleur Islands, and the storm's passage also destroyed the island lighthouse; the three keepers were found three days later. Two schooners were also washed ashore along Cat Island. The hurricane produced an estimated storm tide of 12 ft (3.7 m) in Mobile, Alabama, where strong winds damaged much of the city, leaving the majority of the houses destroyed. Trees were downed up to 30 mi (50 km) inland, and coastal areas were flooded. Damage along the coastline was estimated at $1 million (1852 USD), and at least five people died. While crossing the southeastern United States, the storm brought light rainfall but moderately strong winds; in Charleston, South Carolina, the storm destroyed several bridges and crop fields.

=== Hurricane Two ===
- Category 1 hurricane (SSHWS)
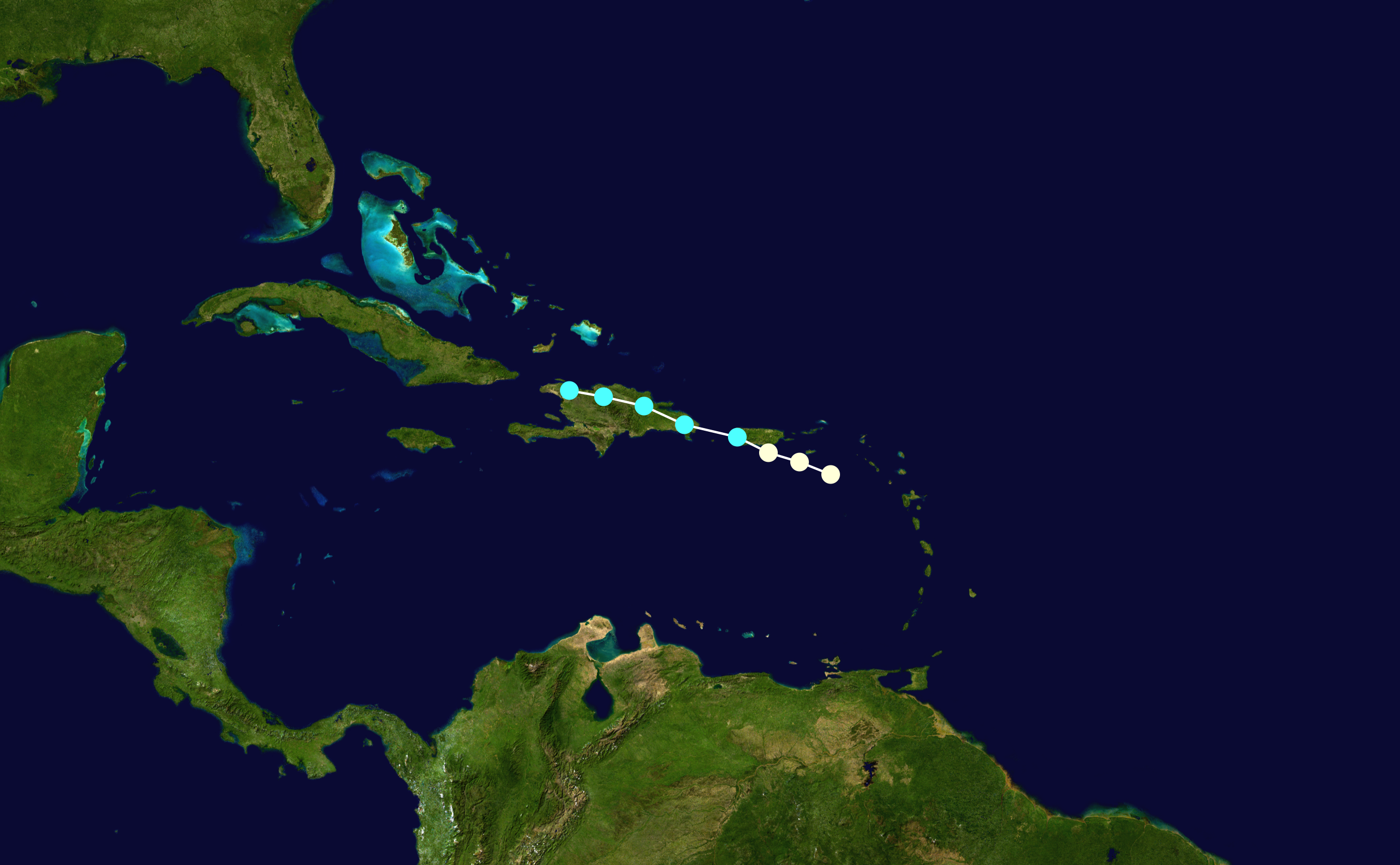
- Duration: September 5 – September 6
- Peak intensity: 80 mph (130 km/h) (1-min);

Hurricane San Lorenzo of 1852

Early on September 5, a hurricane was first observed about 65 mi (105 km) southeast of Christiansted in the Danish Virgin Islands. One meteorologist assessed the hurricane as being located near Antigua on September 3. Tracking steadily west-northwestward, it quickly moved ashore near Ponce, Puerto Rico with winds estimated at 80 mph (130 km/h). After crossing southwestern Puerto Rico, the hurricane emerged into the Mona Passage as a tropical storm. Late on September 5 it made landfall on eastern Dominican Republic; it quickly weakened over Hispaniola, dissipating on September 6 over the northwestern portion of the island. An assessment by scholar Michael Chenoweth in 2006 indicated this storm was the same as the next hurricane, with it continuing northwestward and ultimately reaching the Gulf of Mexico. Due to not being considered the same cyclone in the official hurricane database, this hurricane and the following hurricane are listed separately. There, the passage of the storm caused severe flooding, which destroyed large quantities of crops and damaged several roads. Storm damage was heaviest between Guayanilla and Mayagüez. More than 100 people were killed in Puerto Rico, many of whom died due to flooding.

=== Hurricane Three ===
- Category 1 hurricane (SSHWS)
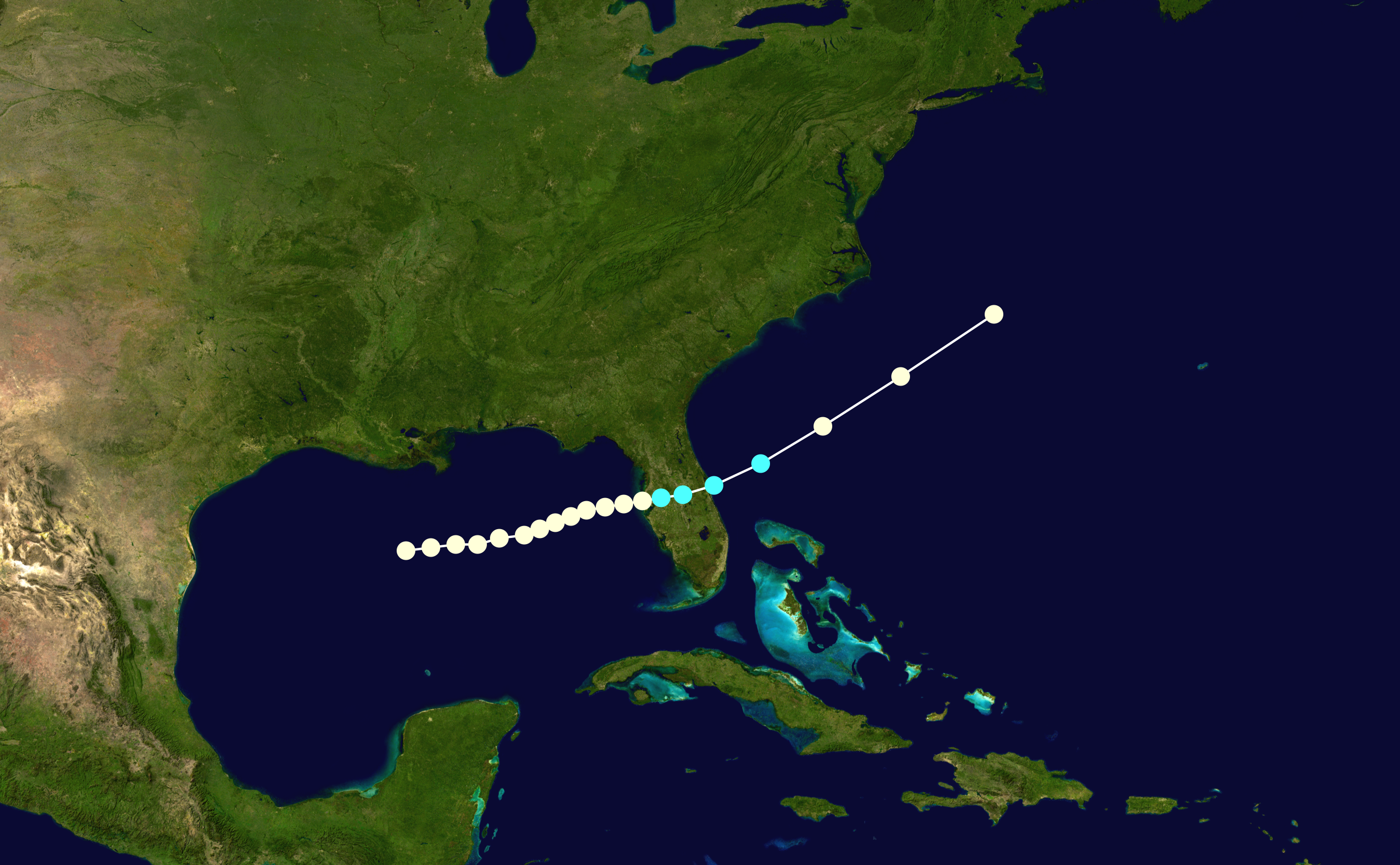
- Duration: September 9 – September 13
- Peak intensity: 80 mph (130 km/h) (1-min); 985 mbar (hPa)

A hurricane was located in the central Gulf of Mexico on September 9, potentially the same hurricane as the previous storm. It tracked generally eastward toward the coast of Florida, with its hurricane intensity estimation based on two ship reports. At about 00:00 UTC on September 12, it moved ashore near Clearwater, Florida, as a minimal hurricane, with an estimated minimum barometric central pressure of 985 mbar (29.1 inHg). Accelerating east-northeastward while crossing the state, the cyclone emerged into the Atlantic Ocean as a weakened tropical storm before regaining hurricane status on September 13. Later that day, it was last observed about 250 mi (400 km) east-southeast of Cape Hatteras.

A post in Fort Meade, Florida, reported at least 0.55 in (14 mm) of rainfall during the storm's passage. The hurricane was considered "violent", and gusts were estimated to have reached hurricane force. Rough seas and strong easterly winds beached a vessel near St. Augustine.

=== Hurricane Four ===
- Category 1 hurricane (SSHWS)
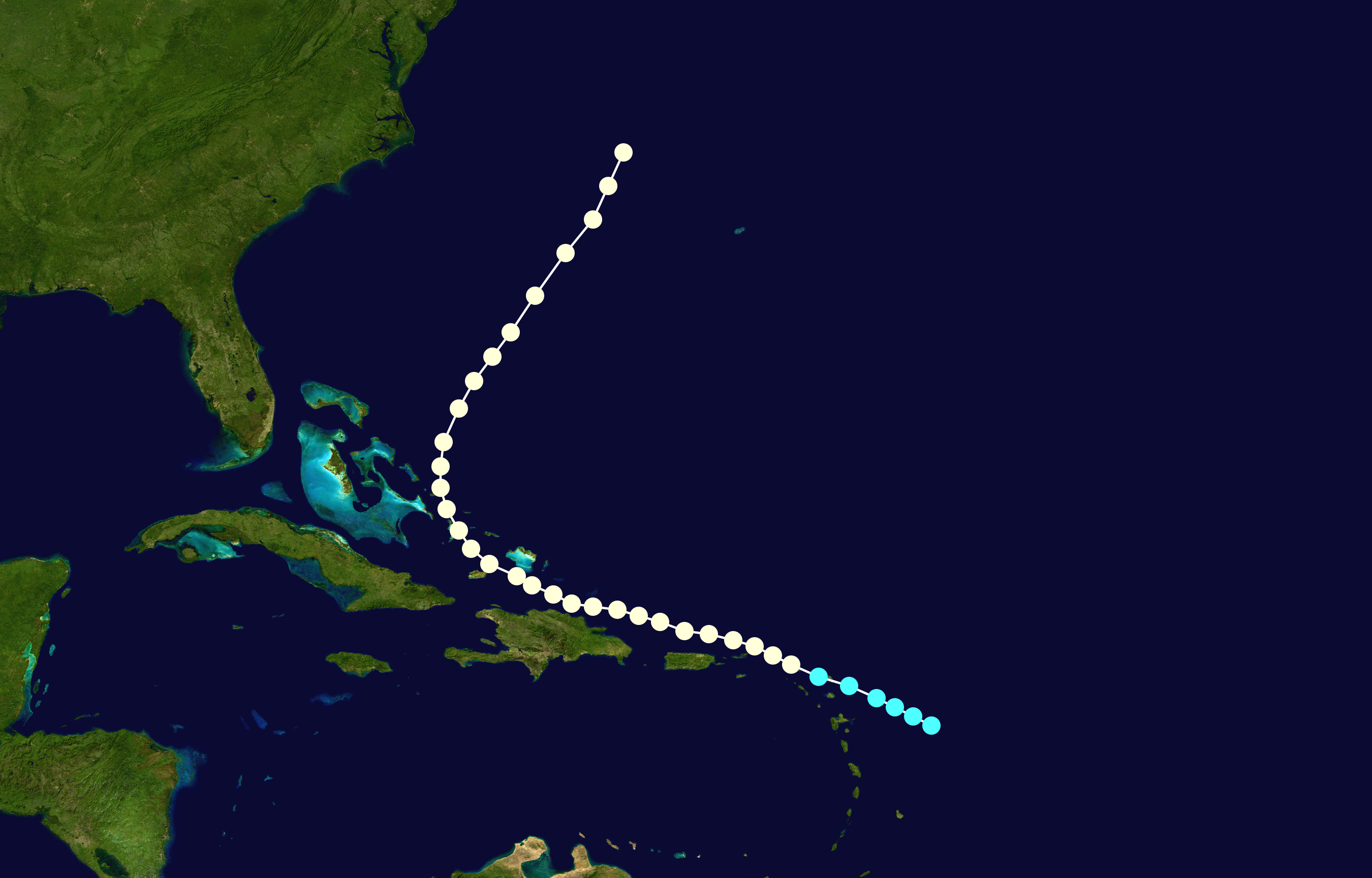
- Duration: September 22 – September 30
- Peak intensity: 90 mph (150 km/h) (1-min);

On September 22, a tropical storm was located about 200 mi (320 km) east of Guadeloupe. With a steady west-northwest path, the storm moved across the northern Lesser Antilles on September 23, during which it intensified into a hurricane. It passed a short distance north of Puerto Rico and the Dominican Republic as it reached its peak intensity of 90 mph (150 km). Late on September 26 the hurricane turned northwestward, bringing it through the Turks and Caicos Islands and eastern Bahamas. Recurving north-northeastward, the cyclone moved into open waters, and was last classified as a tropical cyclone on September 30 about 390 mi (630 km) east of Cape Hatteras. However, one hurricane researcher assessed the hurricane as lasting until October 3, with the cyclone turning eastward and dissipating near the Azores.

=== Hurricane Five ===
- Category 2 hurricane (SSHWS)
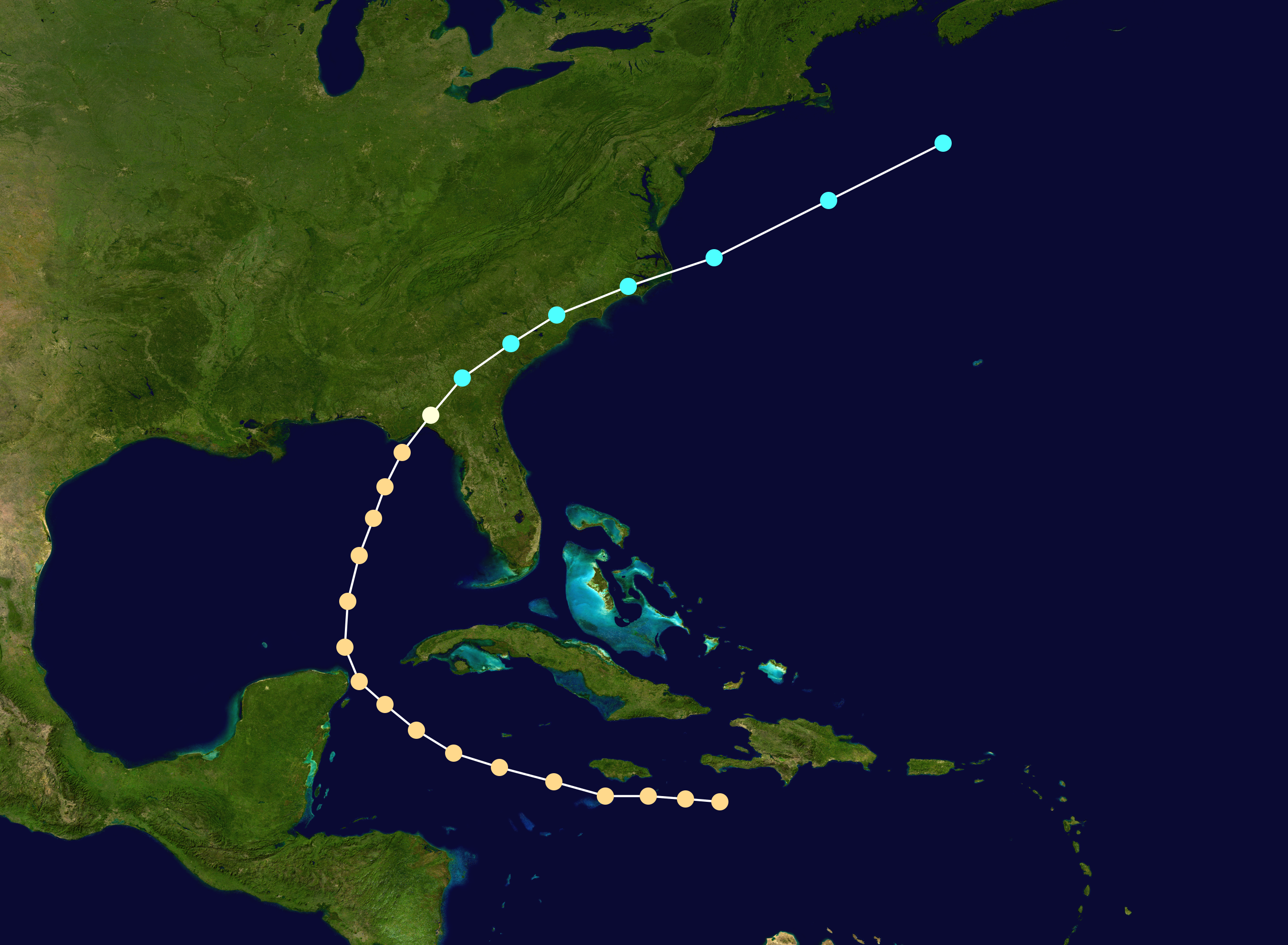
- Duration: October 6 – October 11
- Peak intensity: 105 mph (165 km/h) (1-min); 965 mbar (hPa)

A moderately strong hurricane with winds of 105 mph (165 km/h) was first spotted on October 6 east of Jamaica. Passing a short distance south of the island, the hurricane tracked northwestward and brushed the Yucatán Peninsula before turning north-northeastward into the Gulf of Mexico. Late on October 9, it made landfall a short distance east of Apalachicola, Florida, at peak winds with an estimated pressure of 965 mbar (28.5 inHg). Rapidly weakening to tropical storm status, the cyclone continued northeastward and emerged into the Atlantic Ocean from North Carolina on October 11. Later that day, it was last observed about 250 mi (400 km) southeast of Cape Cod.

Heavy damage was reported in Jamaica. Upon making landfall in Florida, the hurricane produced a 7 ft (2.1 m) storm tide, and in Georgia, hurricane-force winds extended into the southwestern portion of the state, while tropical storm force winds occurred along the coastline. In the state, moderate winds damaged trees and roofs, though the destruction was less than anticipated.

== Season effects ==
This is a table of all of the storms that formed in the 1852 Atlantic hurricane season. It includes their duration (within the basin), names, areas affected, damages, and death totals. Deaths in parentheses are additional and indirect (an example of an indirect death would be a traffic accident), but were still related to that storm. Damage and deaths include totals while the storm was extratropical, a wave, or a low, and all of the damage figures are in 1852 USD.

Saffir–Simpson scale
TD	TS	C1	C2	C3	C4	C5

1852 North Atlantic tropical cyclone season statistics
Storm name	Dates active	Storm category at peak intensity	Max 1-min wind mph (km/h)	Min. press. (mbar)	Areas affected	Damage (US$)	Deaths	Ref(s).
One	August 19–30	Category 3 hurricane	115 (185)	961	Turks and Caicos Islands, Bahamas, Florida, Gulf Coast of the United States (Mississippi), Southeastern United States	$1 million	Unknown	
Two	September 5–6	Category 1 hurricane	80 (130)	Unknown	Puerto Rico, Hispaniola (the Dominican Republic)	Unknown	>100	
Three	September 9–13	Category 1 hurricane	80 (130)	985	Florida	Unknown	None	
Four	September 22–30	Category 1 hurricane	90 (150)	Unknown	Lesser Antilles, Bahamas	Unknown	None	
Five	October 6–11	Category 2 hurricane	105 (165)	965	Jamaica, Southeastern United States (Florida)	Unknown	None	
Season aggregates
5 systems	August 19 – October 11		115 (185)	961		>$1 million	>100	

== See also ==
- Lists of Atlantic hurricanes
- Tropical cyclone forecasting
- HURDAT – A comprehensive record of tropical cyclone tracks since 1851.
- Atlantic reanalysis project – A project to improve historical hurricane data for past storms.
