= 1858 Atlantic hurricane season =

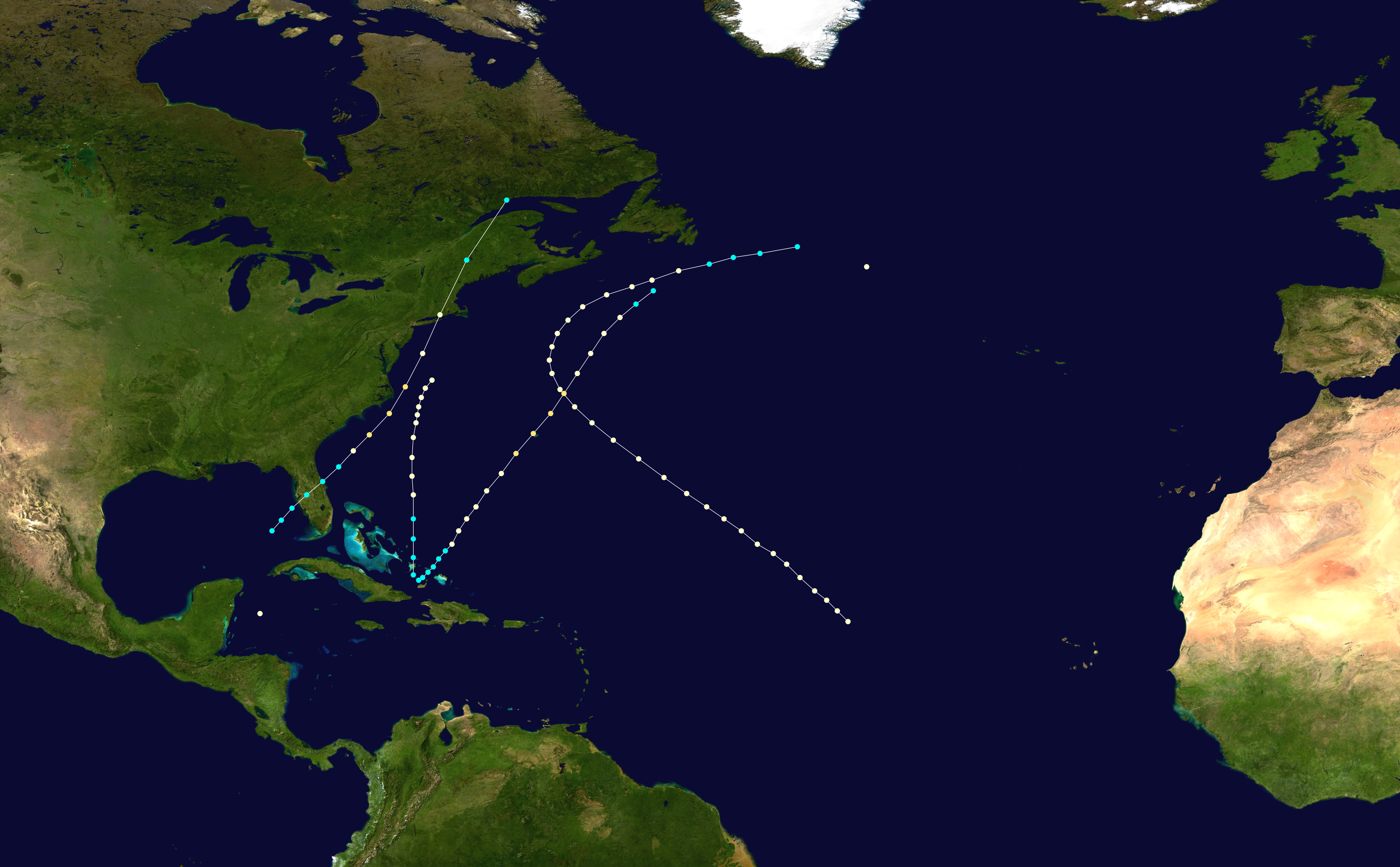
- Season summary map

Seasonal boundaries
- First system formed: June 12, 1858
- Last system dissipated: October 26, 1858

Strongest storm
- Name: Three
  - Maximum winds: 105 mph (165 km/h) (1-minute sustained)
  - Lowest pressure: 979 mbar (hPa; 28.91 inHg)

Seasonal statistics
- Total storms: 6
- Hurricanes: 6
- Major hurricanes (Cat. 3+): 0
- Total fatalities: None
- Total damage: Unknown

The 1858 Atlantic hurricane season was one of only three Atlantic hurricane seasons where every tropical cyclone intensified into a hurricane, after and before the 1852 and 1884 seasons respectively. The first hurricane was first observed over the northwestern Caribbean Sea on June 12. The sixth and final storm was last noted on October 26. These dates fall within the period with the most tropical cyclone activity in the Atlantic. The season also had an accumulated cyclone energy (ACE) rating of 44.79. (Note: There is an undercount bias of Accumulated Cyclone Energy (ACE) before the satellite era (prior to the mid–1960s), due to the difficulty of identifying storms.) Three tropical cyclones during the season existed simultaneously. Two of the cyclones have only a single known point in its track due to a sparsity of data. Operationally, another tropical cyclone was believed to have existed over the eastern Atlantic between September 17 and September 18, however the Atlantic hurricane database excludes this system. Although, with the absence of modern satellite and other remote-sensing technologies, the actual total was likely higher. An undercount bias of zero to six tropical cyclones per year between 1851 and 1885 has been estimated. Of the six known 1858 Atlantic cyclones, five were first documented in 1995 by Jose Fernandez-Partagas and Henry Diaz.

The first system was spotted over the western Caribbean Sea on June 12. It had a single-point track. Another tropical cyclone was first observed over the northern Atlantic Ocean on August 5 and also had a single-point track. On September 14, the next system was observed over the southeastern Gulf of Mexico. Several hours later, the storm struck Florida, causing severe damage to crops. Strong winds and rough seas were reported by ships and on land, particularly in Maine. The storm dissipated on September 17. That same day, another tropical cyclone developed over the central Atlantic. The storm capsized the bark Phantom, though no one drowned. The next hurricane developed over the Bahamas on September 22, but caused little damage, despite its proximity to land. On October 21, the sixth and final system of the season was first observed over the Bahamas. The storm brought coastal flooding to Nassau and Bermuda later in its duration, before dissipating on October 26.

== Systems ==
=== Hurricane One ===
- Category 1 hurricane (SSHWS)
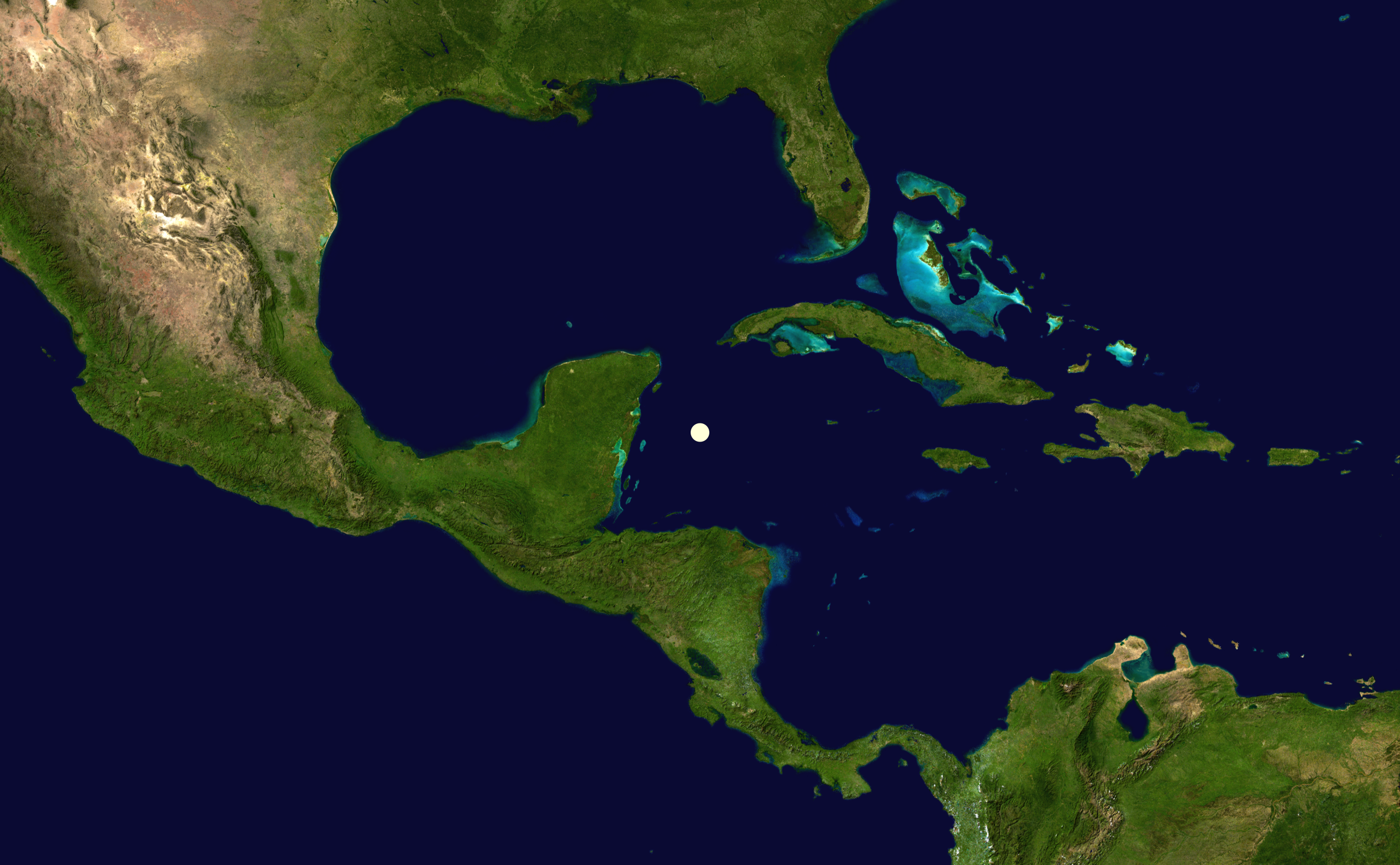
- Duration: June 12 – June 12
- Peak intensity: 80 mph (130 km/h) (1-min);

On June 12, the brig L. H. Sampson encountered a hurricane in the northwestern Caribbean Sea. The vessel suffered some damage. The storm was a Category 1 hurricane on the modern day Saffir–Simpson hurricane wind scale with winds of 80 mph (130 km/h), based on observations from that ship.

=== Hurricane Two ===
- Category 1 hurricane (SSHWS)
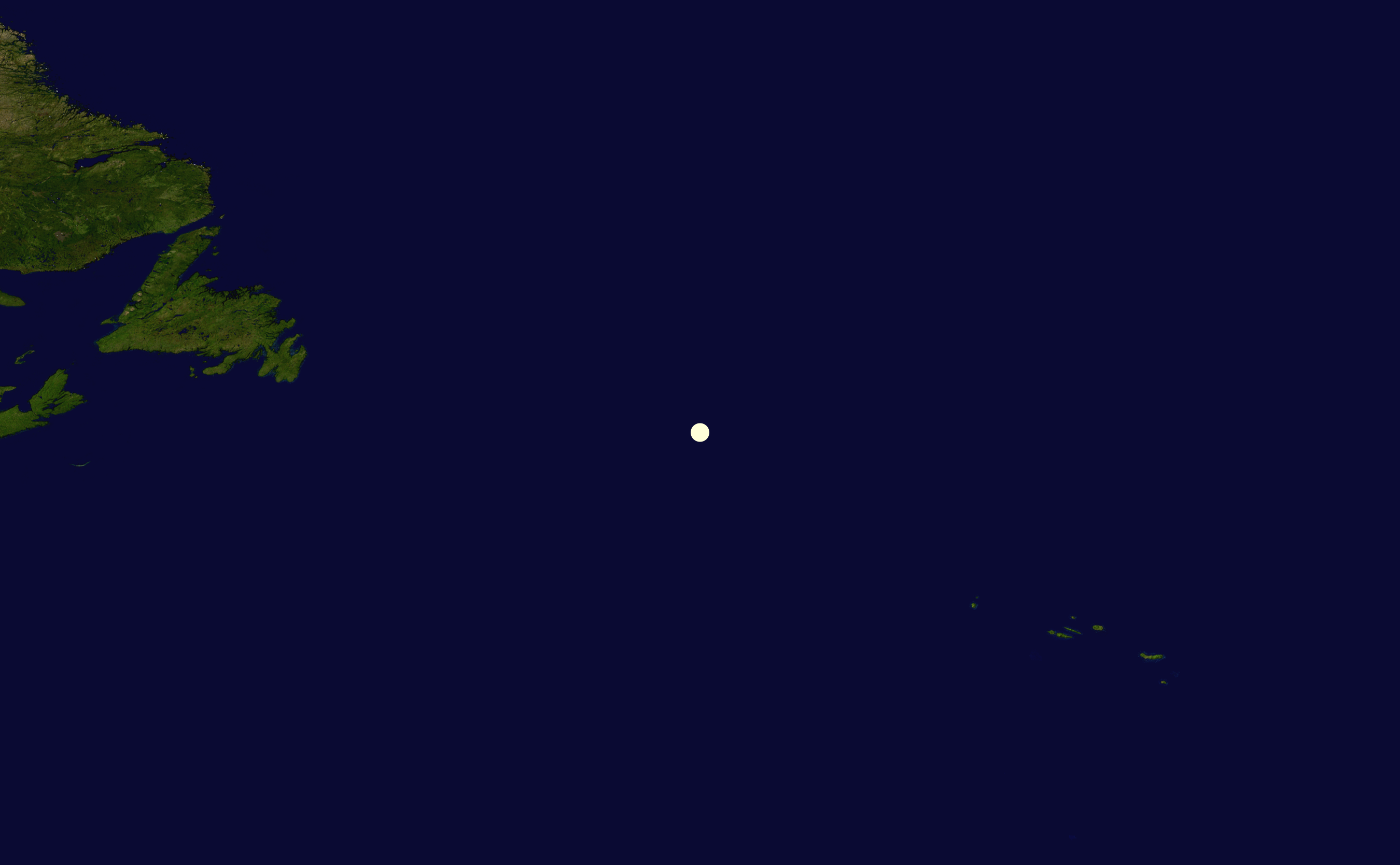
- Duration: August 5 – August 5
- Peak intensity: 80 mph (130 km/h) (1-min);

A Category 1 hurricane was first observed about 585 mi (940 km) west-northwest of Corvo Island in the Azores on August 5, based on reports from two ships, the Shelter and the A.Z.Greenland. Another ship that encountered the storm, the Magistrate, was abandoned. Climate researcher Michael Chenoweth considers this system to have been extratropical, noting that although data supports the presence of a strong low-pressure area, there is "no convincing evidence of a tropical system".

=== Hurricane Three ===
1858 New England hurricane

- Category 2 hurricane (SSHWS)
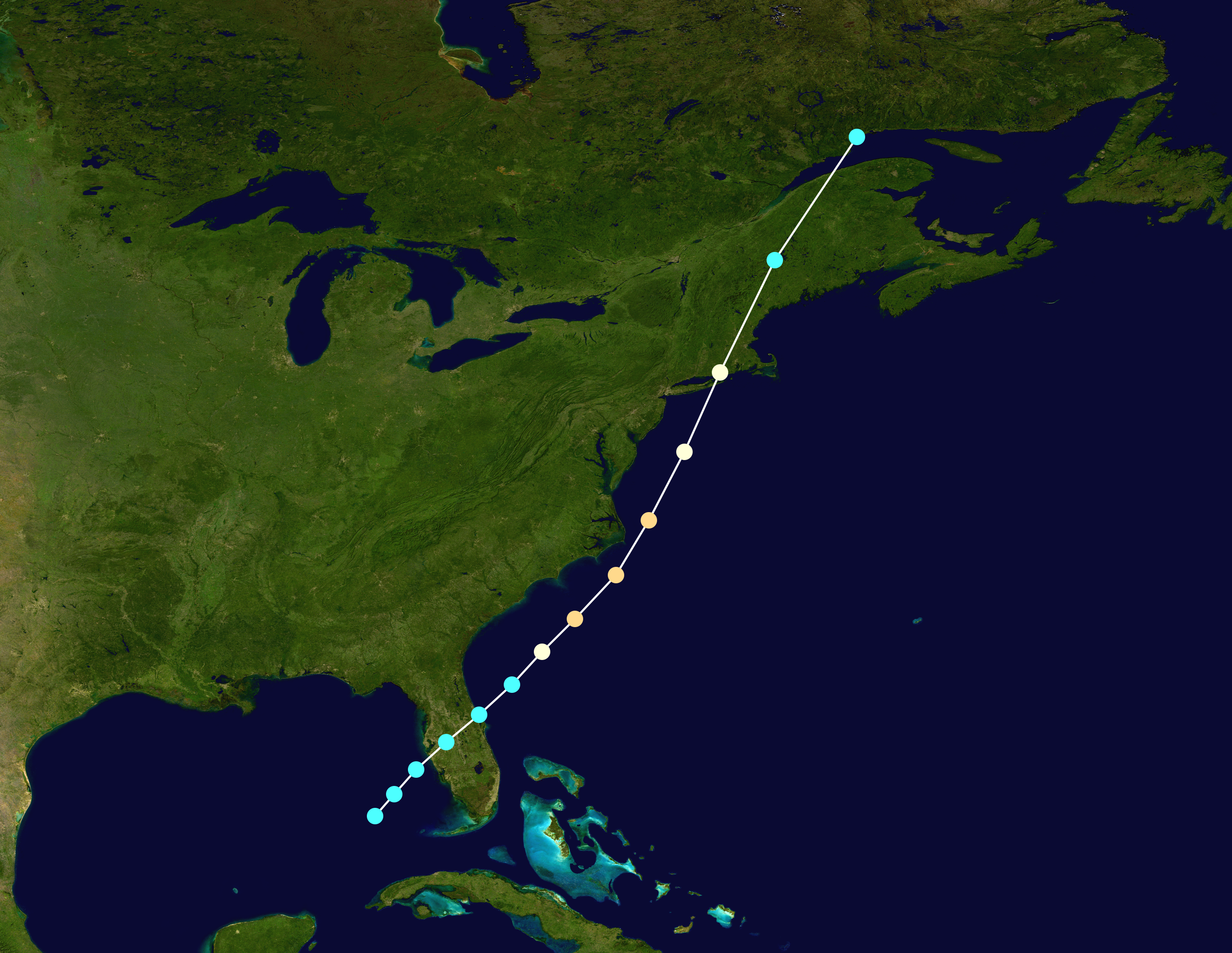
- Duration: September 14 – September 17
- Peak intensity: 105 mph (165 km/h) (1-min); 979 mbar (hPa)

The bark Cavallo encountered experienced severe weather in the eastern Gulf of Mexico between September 13 and September 15. It is believed that a tropical storm developed on September 14. Moving northeastward, the storm made landfall near modern-day Palmetto, Florida, at 15:00 UTC, with winds of 70 mph (110 km/h). While crossing the state, the storm brought severe damage. Ships remained in port at river ports in the state and at St. Marys, Georgia. After emerging into the Atlantic Ocean near Oak Hill, Florida early on September 15, the system reached hurricane status several hours later. Shortly thereafter, the storm intensified into a Category 2 hurricane, peaking with winds of 105 mph (165 km/h). On September 16, the hurricane passed offshore North Carolina and then weakened to a Category 1 hurricane while east of the Mid-Atlantic states.

At 17:00 UTC on September 16, the storm made landfall near East Hampton, New York with winds of 80 mph (130 km/h). About an hour later, it struck again just west of Groton, Connecticut with winds of 75 mph (120 km/h). Early on September 17, the system weakened to a tropical storm and dissipated over the Gulf of Saint Lawrence several hours later. Parts of this storm were first described by David M. Ludlum, who called it The New England Tropical Storm of 1858. However, barometer readings taken at Sag Harbor, New York and Providence, Rhode Island, along with ship reports and wind speeds recorded at Bangor, Maine and Nantucket, Massachusetts, conclude that the system reached hurricane intensity. In Maine, strong gales occurred, with Bangor reported having "one of the heaviest in years." Trees and chimneys toppled throughout the southeastern portions of the state. There was also minor damage to shipping in Belfast.

=== Hurricane Four ===
- Category 1 hurricane (SSHWS)
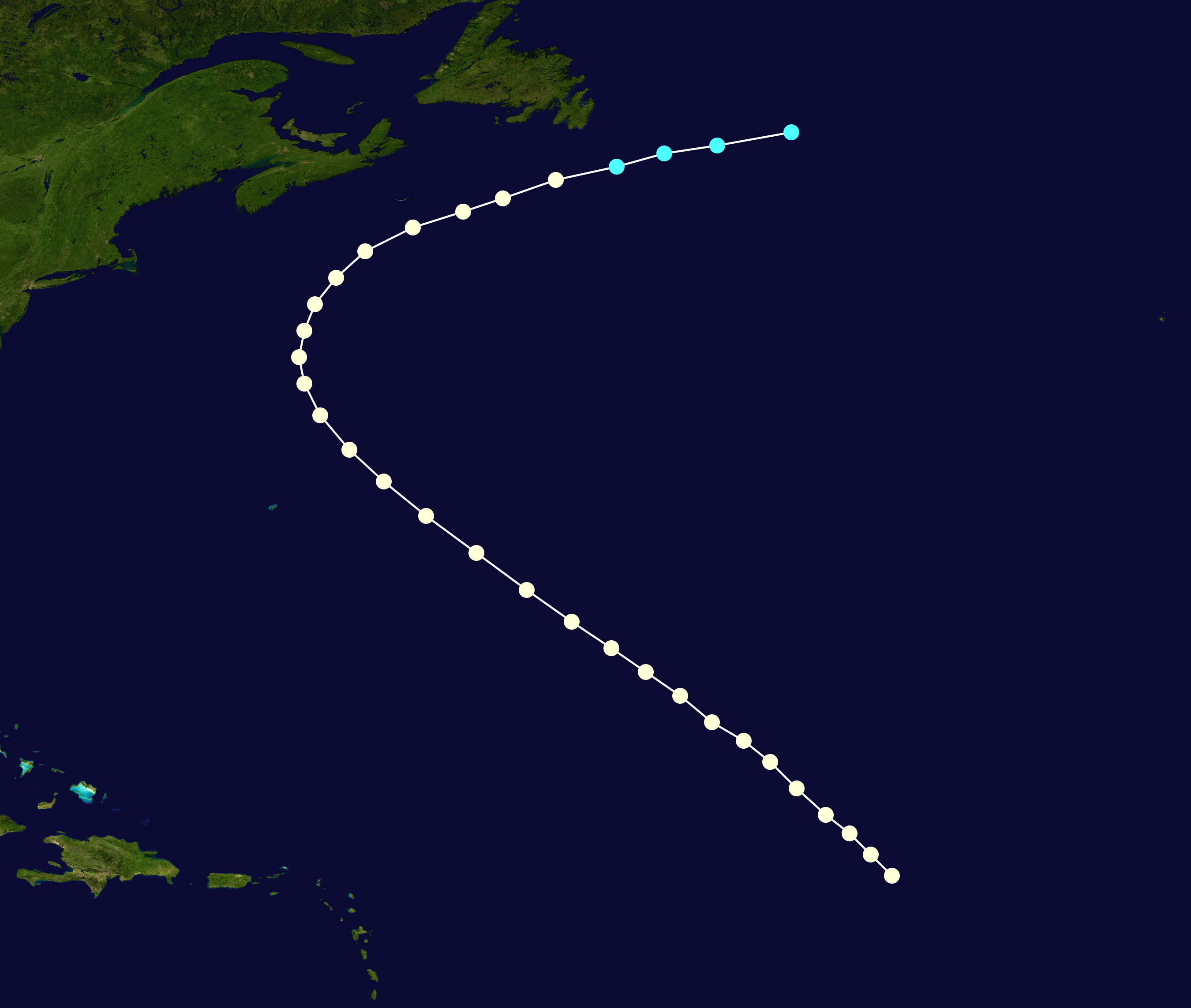
- Duration: September 17 – September 24
- Peak intensity: 90 mph (150 km/h) (1-min);

On September 17, a hurricane was observed in the mid-Atlantic by the bark Phantom. Later that day, the Phantom sank, though all of the crew survived. They described the system as a 'perfect hurricane' with a lull around midnight on September 17 before the wind changed direction and blew with even greater force than before. The hurricane continued travelling on a northwest track and between September 22 and the night of September 23 it was encountered by the Hudson, the City of Washington and the bark Lanark. The system weakened to a tropical storm early on September 24 and dissipated later that day about 610 mi (980 km) east of Cape Race, Newfoundland. Until the Atlantic hurricane reanalysis project's reassessment of the season in 2003, this storm was considered two separate systems, including in the 1995 study by Fernández-Partagás and Diaz. However, they stated that further information could indicate a single storm.

=== Hurricane Five ===
- Category 1 hurricane (SSHWS)
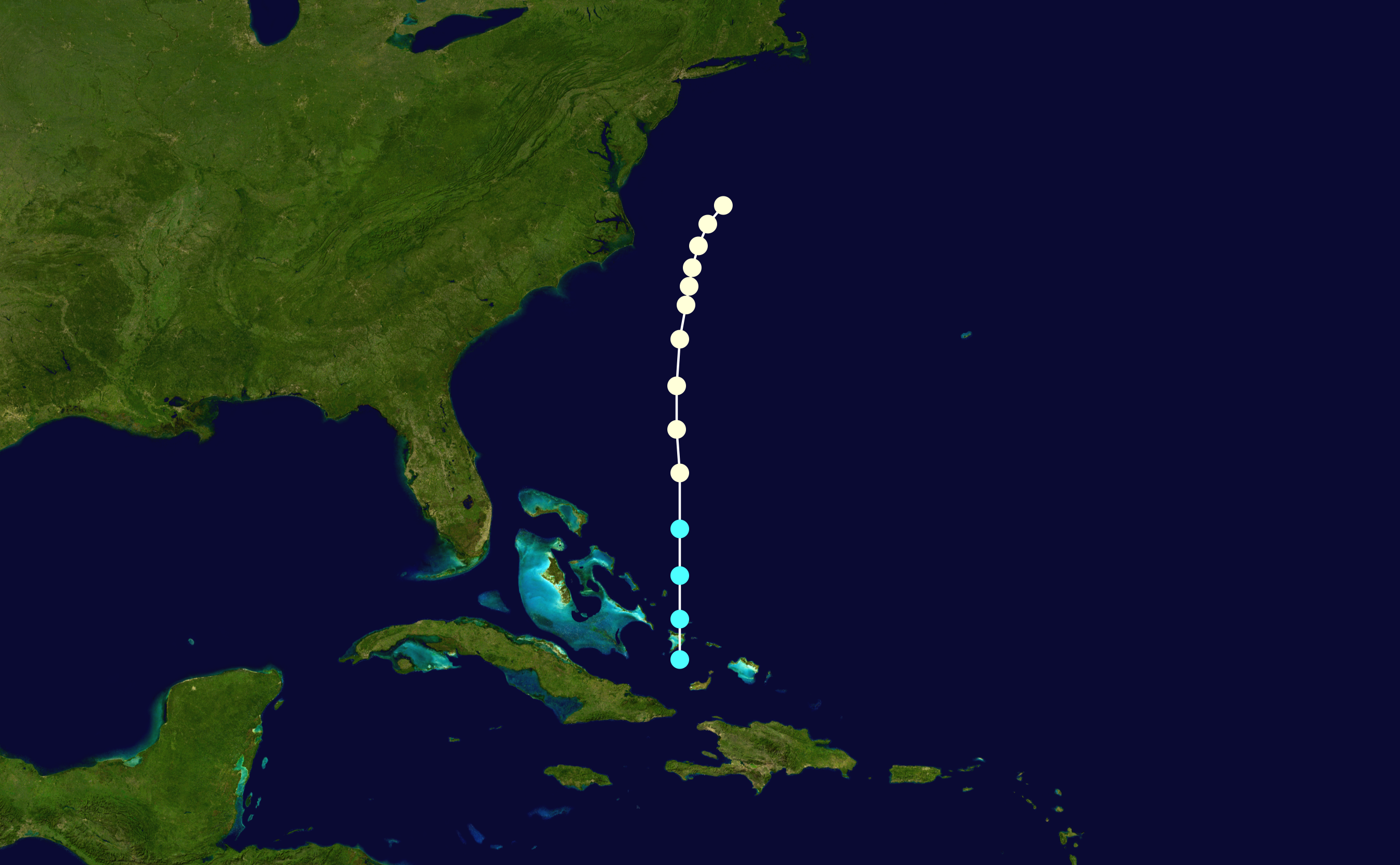
- Duration: September 22 – September 25
- Peak intensity: 90 mph (150 km/h) (1-min);

Based on reports from the bark Wm. H. Chandler, a tropical storm developed in the Bahamas near Acklins on September 22. Moving northward, the storm strengthened into a Category 1 hurricane by 12:00 UTC the next day. Later on September 23, the Harkaway noted a "severe hurricane" at Bermuda, though the report was considered "doubtful" due to the storm's distance from the island. The hurricane continued northward and was last noted about 200 mi (320 km) east of Virginia on September 25, after the Priscilla observed sustained winds of 90 mph (150 km/h).

=== Hurricane Six ===
- Category 2 hurricane (SSHWS)
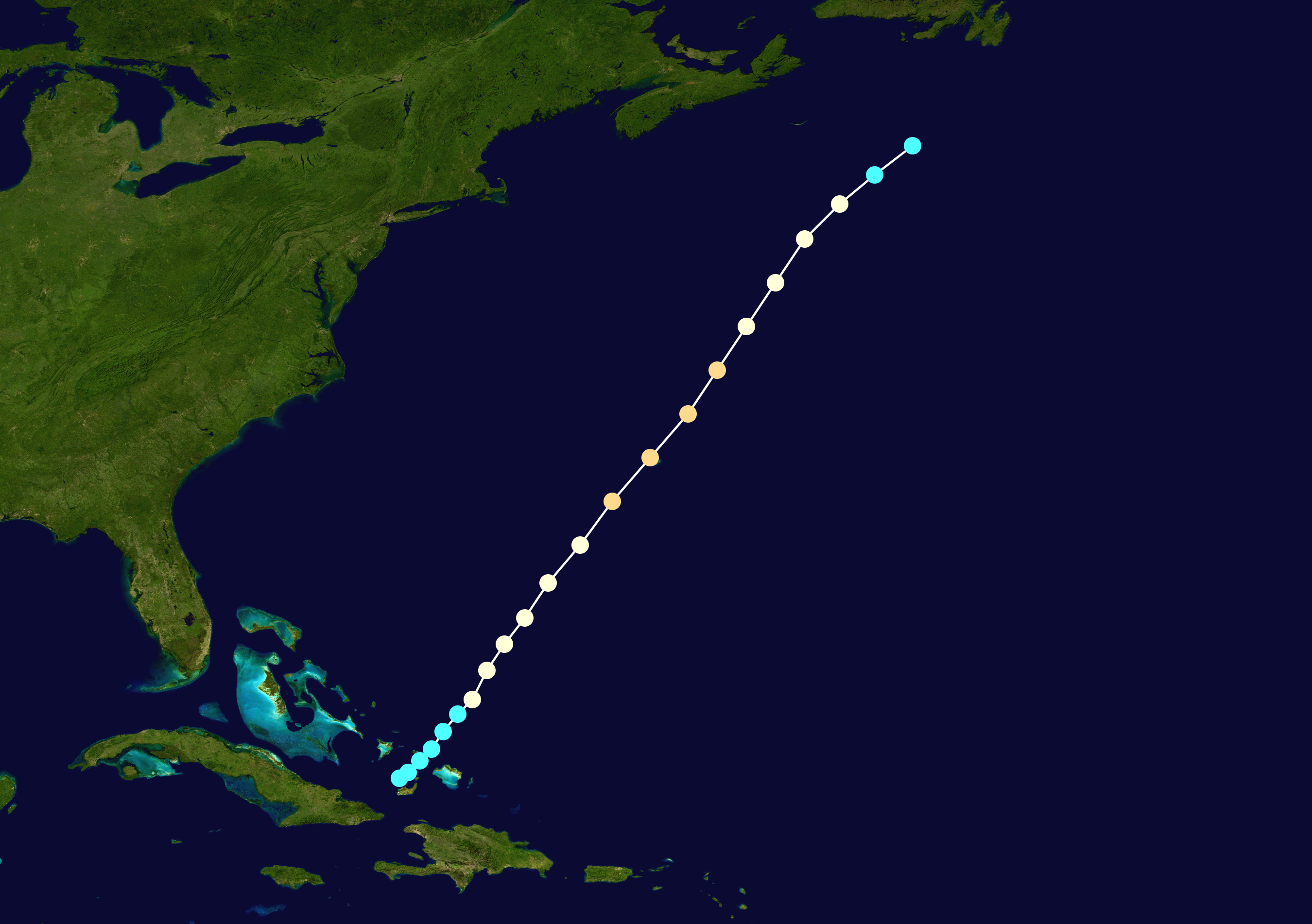
- Duration: October 21 – October 26
- Peak intensity: 105 mph (165 km/h) (1-min);

The final known tropical cyclone of the season was first observed by the brig Sea Lark on October 21, while located just north of Inagua in the Bahamas. Throughout the Bahamas, storm surge impacted some islands. At Nassau, several ships were driven ashore, parts of the town were flooded and buildings along the shoreline suffered damage. The storm moved northeastward and strengthened into a hurricane at 12:00 UTC on October 22. About 24 hours later, the hurricane deepened into a Category 2 hurricane. Later on October 23, it passed just west of Bermuda. Gale force winds and rough seas were observed on the island, causing damage to several vessels. Peaking with winds of 105 mph (165 km/h), the storm began to weaken, falling to Category 1 intensity on October 25. It weakened to a tropical storm early the following day and dissipated hours later, while located about 195 mi (315 km) east-southeast of Sable Island.

== Season effects ==
This is a table of all of the known storms that formed in the 1858 Atlantic hurricane season. It includes their duration (within the basin), areas affected, damages, and death totals. Deaths in parentheses are additional and indirect (an example of an indirect death would be a traffic accident), but were still related to that storm. Damage and deaths include totals while the storm was extratropical, a wave, or a low, and all of the damage figures are in 1858 USD.

Saffir–Simpson scale
TD	TS	C1	C2	C3	C4	C5

1858 North Atlantic tropical cyclone season statistics
Storm name	Dates active	Storm category at peak intensity	Max 1-min wind mph (km/h)	Min. press. (mbar)	Areas affected	Damage (US$)	Deaths	Ref(s).
One	June 12	Category 1 hurricane	80 (130)	Unknown		Unknown	None	
Two	August 5	Category 1 hurricane	80 (130)	Unknown		Unknown	None	
Three	September 14–17	Category 2 hurricane	105 (165)	979	Florida & East Coast of the United States	Unknown	Unreported	
Four	September 17–24	Category 1 hurricane	90 (150)	Unknown		Unknown	None	
Five	September 22–25	Category 1 hurricane	90 (150)	Unknown		Unknown	None	
Six	October 21–26	Category 2 hurricane	105 (165)	Unknown	The Bahamas & Bermuda	Unknown	None	
Season aggregates
6 systems	June 12 – October 26		105 (165)	979		Unknown	None	

== See also ==
- Lists of Atlantic hurricanes
- Tropical cyclone forecasting
- HURDAT – A comprehensive record of tropical cyclone tracks since 1851.
- Atlantic reanalysis project – A project to improve historical hurricane data for past storms.
