= 1884 Atlantic hurricane season =

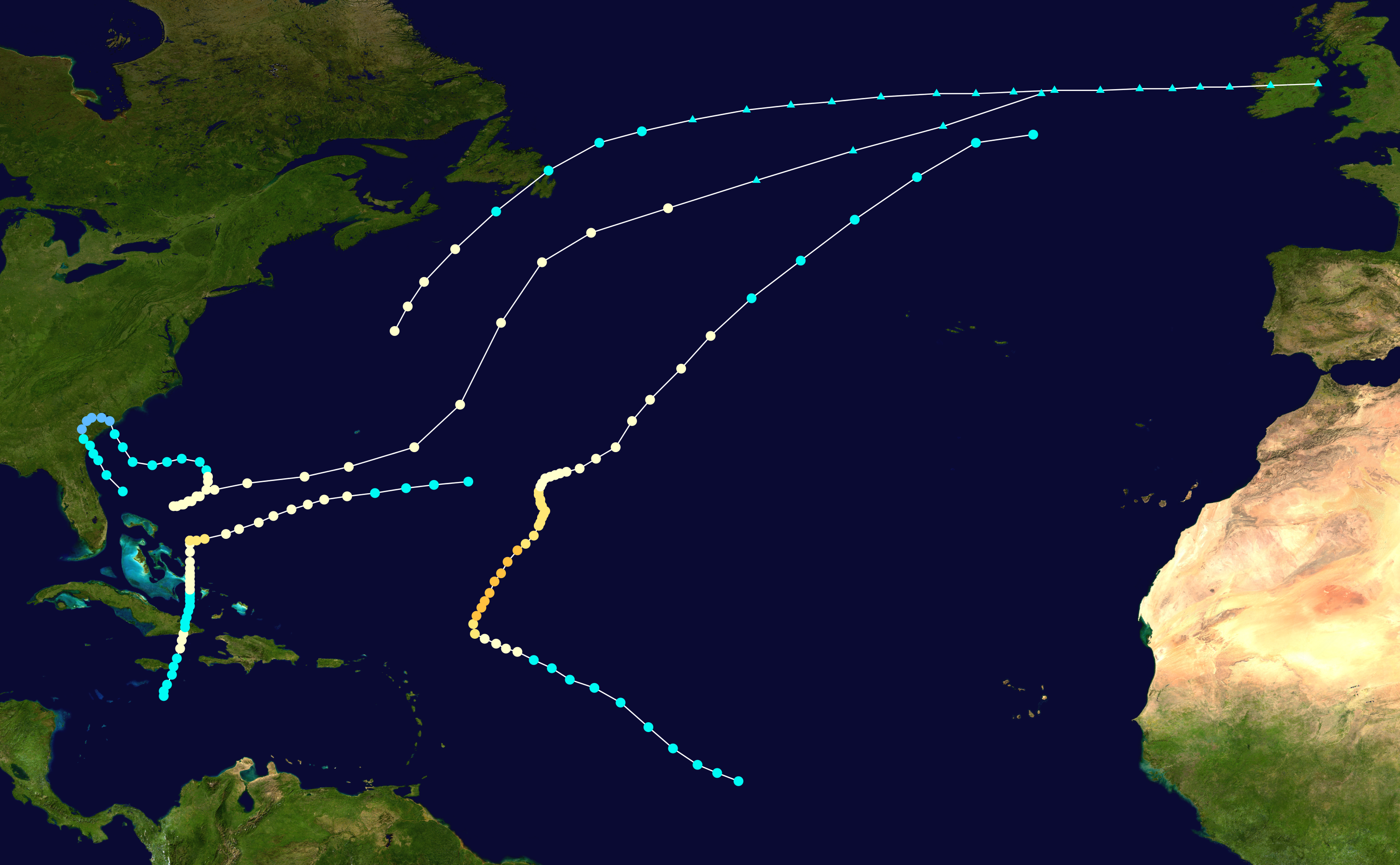
- Season summary map

Seasonal boundaries
- First system formed: September 1, 1884
- Last system dissipated: October 17, 1884

Strongest storm
- Name: Two
  - Maximum winds: 115 mph (185 km/h) (1-minute sustained)
  - Lowest pressure: 957 mbar (hPa; 28.26 inHg)

Seasonal statistics
- Total depressions: 4
- Total storms: 4
- Hurricanes: 4
- Major hurricanes (Cat. 3+): 1
- Total fatalities: 8
- Total damage: Unknown

The 1884 Atlantic hurricane season was the last of only three Atlantic hurricane seasons, succeeding 1852 and 1858, in which every known tropical cyclone attained hurricane status. Overall, four tropical cyclones developed, three of which made landfall. The first system was initially observed over the northwestern Atlantic Ocean on September 1. It struck Newfoundland the following day, but impact there is unknown. On September 3, the next hurricane developed, though it did not affect land in its duration. The third hurricane struck Georgia, accompanied by damaging waves in north Florida.

The final storm was last noted on October 17. These dates fall within the period with the most tropical cyclone activity in the Atlantic. Only two tropical cyclones during the season existed simultaneously. The hurricane brought heavy rainfall to Jamaica, resulting in eight deaths. This storm also left damage to crops and vessels in portions of the Bahamas and Cuba. Because technologies such as satellite monitoring were not available until the 1960s, historical data on tropical cyclones from this period may not be comprehensive. An undercount bias of zero to six tropical cyclones per year between 1851 and 1885 has been estimated.

== Systems ==
=== Hurricane One ===
- Category 1 hurricane (SSHWS)
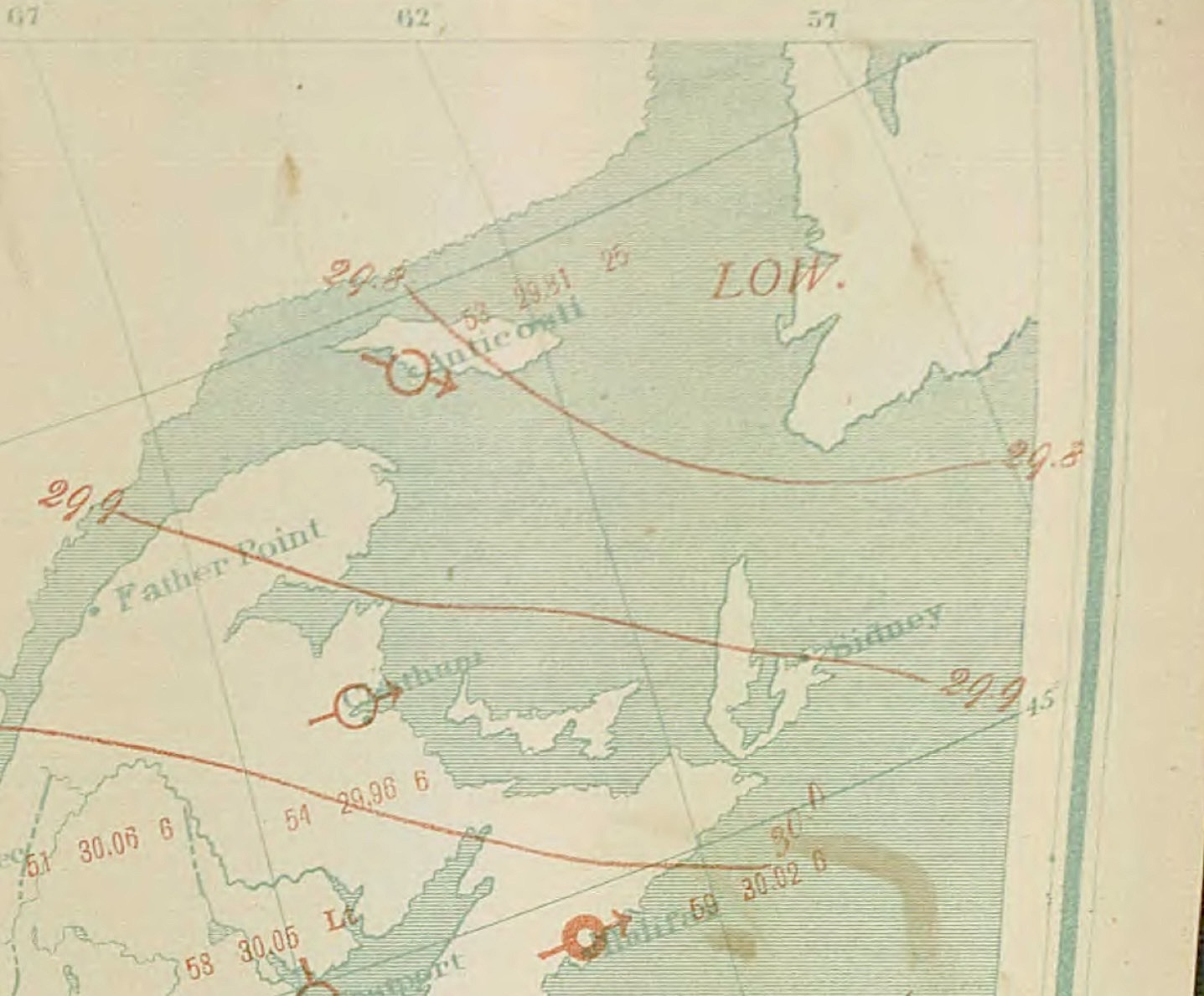
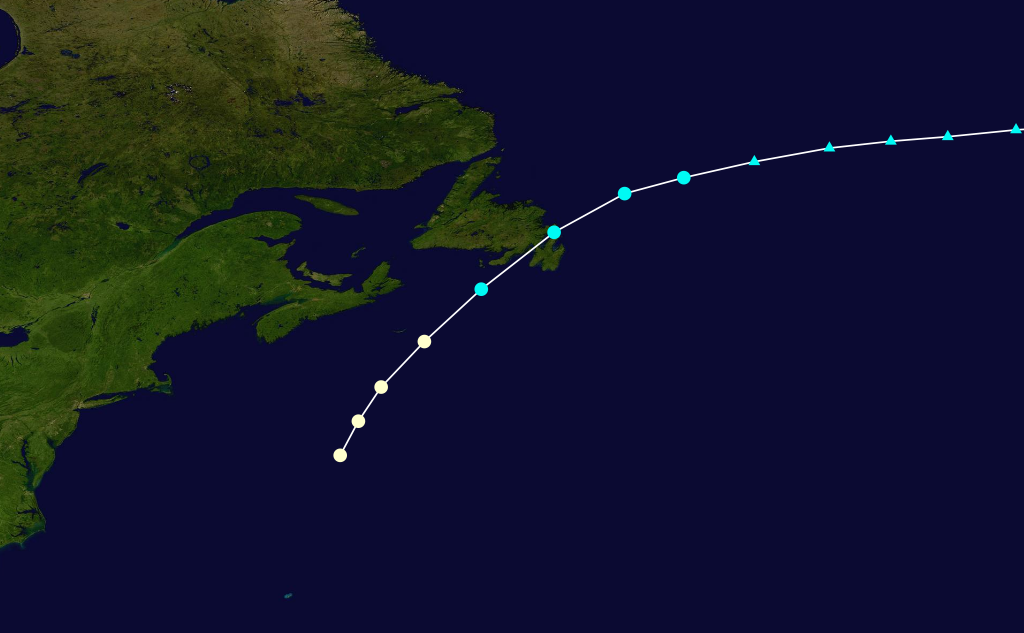
- Duration: September 1 – September 2
- Peak intensity: 80 mph (130 km/h) (1-min); 997 mbar (hPa)

The first storm of the season was spotted by the steamship State of Nebraska, while located about midway between Bermuda and Sable Island at 00:00 UTC on September 1. Initially, sustained winds of 80 mph (130 km/h) were observed, equivalent to a Category 1 hurricane. Later on September 1, the bark Engelbert lost spars and sail to the east of Sable Island. Additionally, the Naupactus encountered heavy seas and lost a portion of its deckload. Early on September 2, the hurricane weakened to a tropical storm. Shortly thereafter, it made landfall in southeastern Newfoundland. Accelerating northeastward, the storm transitioned into an extratropical cyclone around 00:00 UTC on September 3, while located about 460 mi (740 km) northeast of St. John's, Newfoundland and Labrador. The extratropical remnants moved east-northeastward across the Atlantic and struck Ireland, before dissipating late on September 6. This hurricane was added to HURDAT based on a study by Jose F. Partagas and Henry F. Diaz in 1996.

=== Hurricane Two ===
- Category 3 hurricane (SSHWS)
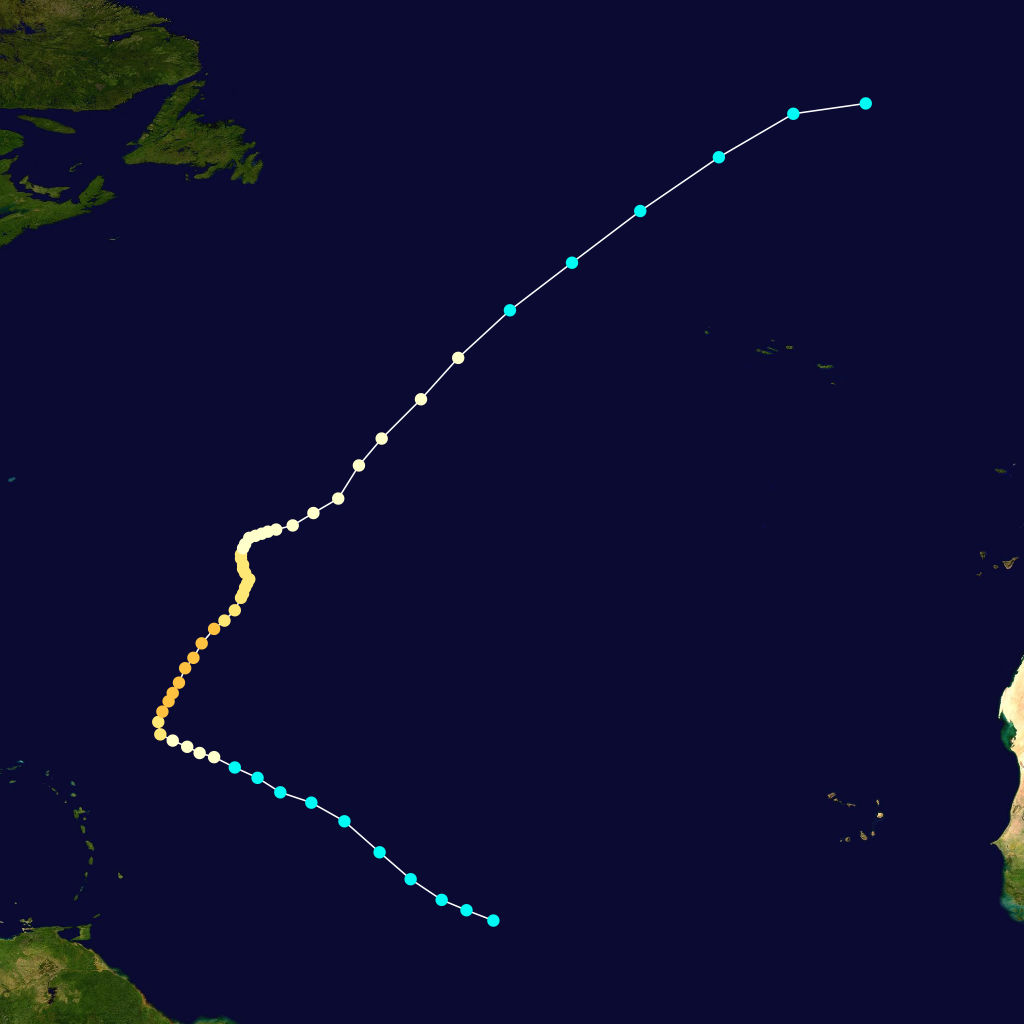
- Duration: September 3 – September 16
- Peak intensity: 115 mph (185 km/h) (1-min); 957 mbar (hPa)

Another tropical storm was first observed by the bark Campero at 00:00 UTC on September 3, while located about 850 mi (1,370 km) northeast of Cayenne, French Guiana. Moving west-northwestward, the storm intensified into a Category 1 hurricane on September 5. The brig Comalo was damaged by the hurricane and was leaky and dismasted upon arrival in Saint Thomas, U.S. Virgin Islands. By midday on September 6, the storm strengthened into a Category 2 hurricane. Early the following day, the system further intensified into a Category 3 hurricane while curving northeastward.

At 12:00 UTC on September 7, the storm attained its peak intensity with maximum sustained winds of 115 mph (185 km/h) and a minimum barometric pressure of 957 mbar (28.3 inHg). Early the following day, the system weakened to a Category 2 hurricane. Around 00:00 UTC on September 12, the storm deteriorated further to a Category 1 hurricane. The next day, the hurricane began accelerating to the northeast. The steamship Marseille encountered the storm on September 14 and suffered damage. By midday on September 15, the hurricane weakened to a tropical storm and dissipated late on September 16, while located about 575 mi (925 km) west-southwest of Ireland.

=== Hurricane Three ===
- Category 1 hurricane (SSHWS)
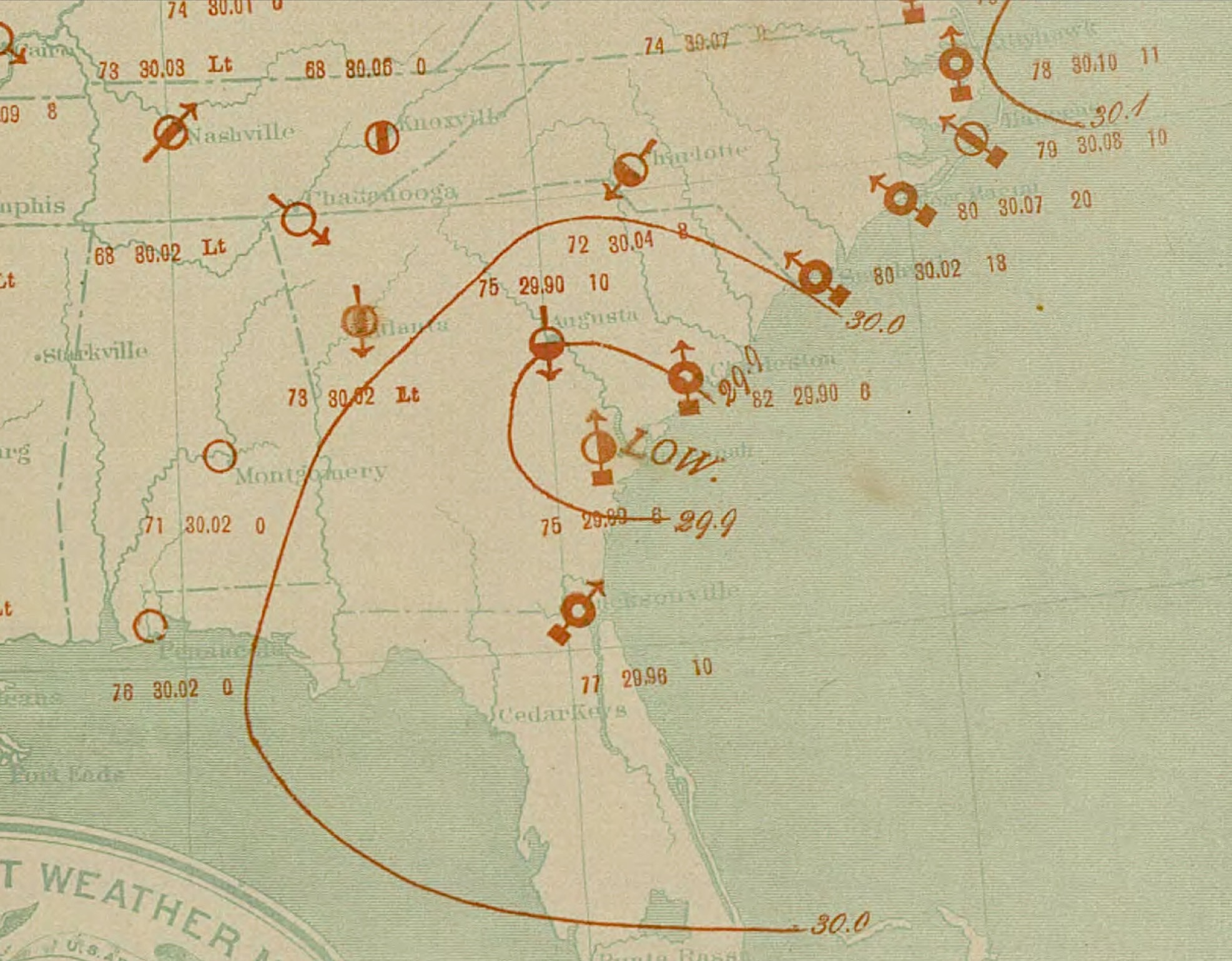
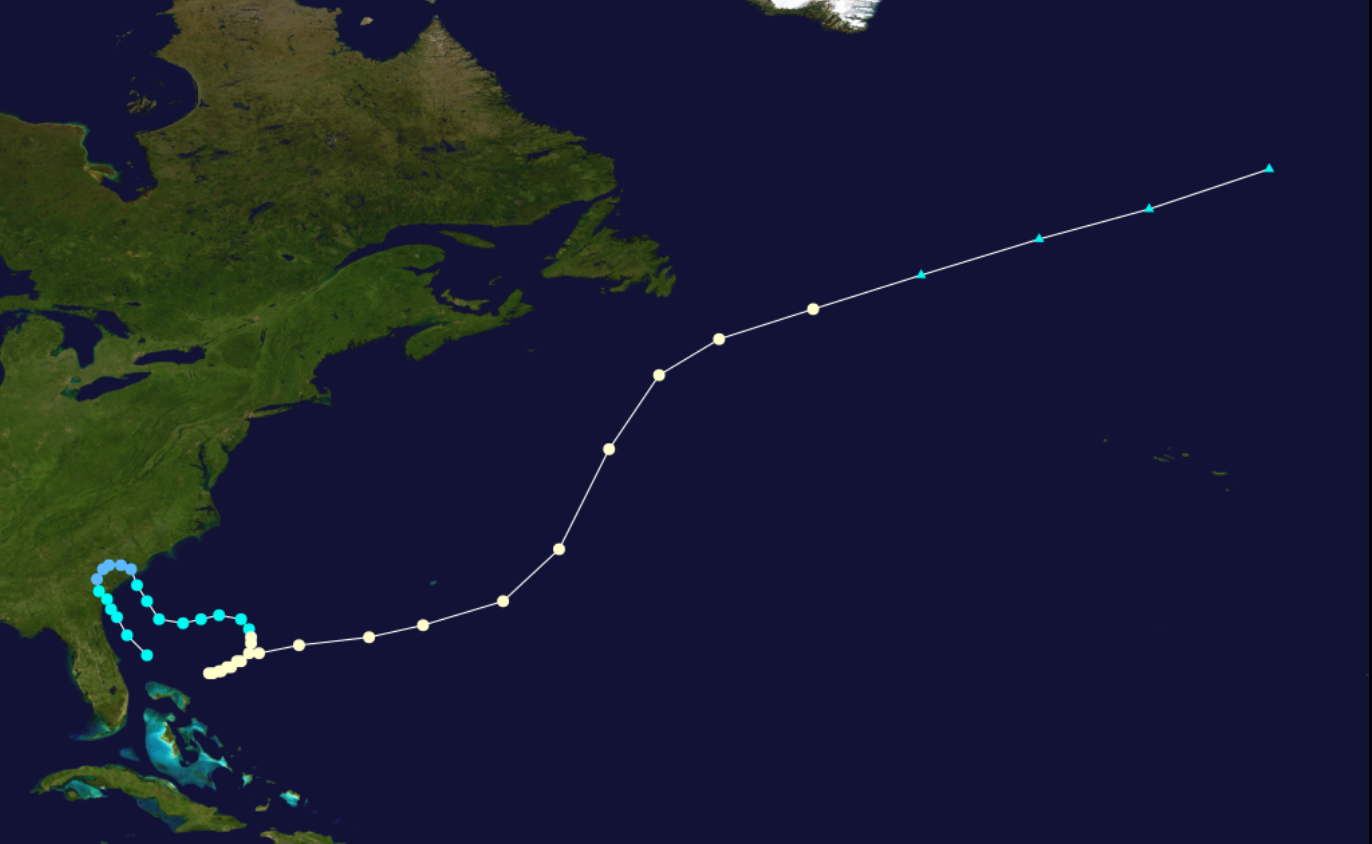
- Duration: September 10 – September 19
- Peak intensity: 90 mph (150 km/h) (1-min); 979 mbar (hPa)

Early on September 10, the steamship City of Palatka encountered a tropical storm, while located about 90 mi (140 km) east-northeast of Cape Canaveral, Florida. Heading northwestward, the storm made landfall in a rural area of McIntosh County, Georgia at 01:00 UTC on September 11, with winds of 45 mph (75 km/h). Hours later, the system weakened to a tropical depression. Late on September 12, the depression re-emerged into the Atlantic Ocean and soon re-strengthened into a tropical storm. Thereafter, the storm headed southeastward and then eastward while slowly intensifying. By September 14, the system turned southward and became a Category 1 hurricane. It curved west-southwestward on September 15, then doubled-back by the following day.

The hurricane accelerated east-northeastward starting on September 17, before turning northeastward on September 18. Around 06:00 UTC, the system attained its peak intensity with maximum sustained winds of 90 mph (150 km/h) and a minimum barometric pressure of 979 mbar (28.9 inHg). At 00:00 UTC on September 20, the hurricane transitioned into an extratropical cyclone while situated about 575 mi (925 km) east of St. John's, Newfoundland and Labrador. Unusually high tides were reported at St. Johns, Florida, causing considerable damage to wharves and freight between September 15 and September 18, long after the storm moved offshore the Southeastern United States. In North Carolina, the cyclone dropped 8.09 in (205 mm) of precipitation at Wilmington, leaving streets and sidewalks nearly impassable. Fort Macon observed sustained winds of 32 mph (51 km/h).

=== Hurricane Four ===
- Category 2 hurricane (SSHWS)
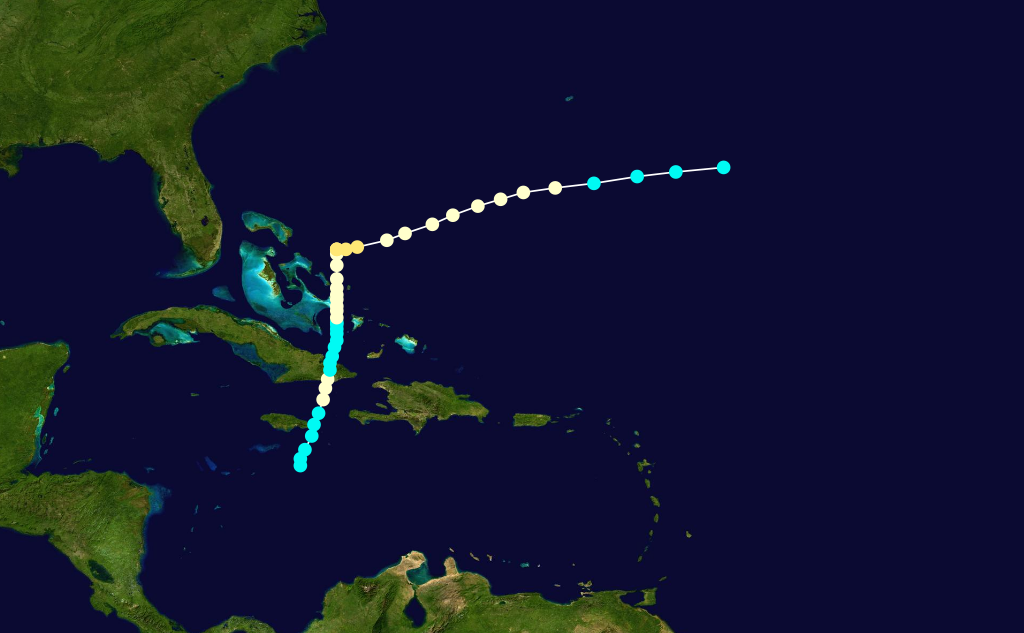
- Duration: October 7 – October 17
- Peak intensity: 105 mph (165 km/h) (1-min); 980 mbar (hPa)

The final known tropical cyclone of the season was first observed in the Caribbean Sea by the steamship Cienfuegos on October 7, while located about 120 mi (190 km) south-southeast of Kingston, Jamaica. That day, the storm dropped heavy rainfall on the island, resulting in at least eight fatalities. Moving north-northeastward, the system strengthened into a Category 1 hurricane on October 8. Early the next day, the hurricane made landfall in Cuba near modern-day Guantánamo Bay with winds of 80 mph (130 km/h). While crossing the island, the system weakened to a tropical storm on October 9. In Oriente Province, "some heavy damage" and several injuries were reported. Around midday on October 9, the storm emerged into the Atlantic Ocean near Frank País, Cuba.

Continuing northward, the system became a Category 1 hurricane again on October 11. In the Bahamas, considerable damage was inflicted upon crops and fruit plantations. A number of shipping vessels were also lost. The brigantine Emma L. Hall, which was carrying 12,000 bushels of salt, suffered severe damage. At Grand Turk Island, the hurricane was considered the worst storm in 25 years. After moving north of the Bahamas, the storm strengthened into a Category 2 hurricane on October 14 and peaked with sustained winds of 105 mph (165 km/h). Shortly thereafter, the hurricane curved north-northeastward and weakened to a Category 1 hurricane on the next day. Further weakening occurred and the system fell to tropical storm intensity by October 17. The storm was last noted about 450 mi (720 km) southeast of Bermuda.

== See also ==
- Atlantic hurricane season
- Tropical cyclone observation
- Atlantic hurricane reanalysis project
