= Christopher Landsea =

American meteorologist

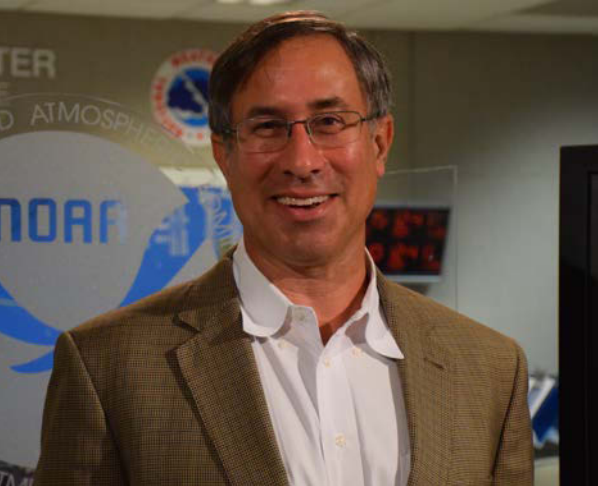
- Born: February 4, 1965 (age 61)
- Citizenship: American
- Education: Ph.D. in Atmospheric Science
- Alma mater: Colorado State University
- Occupation: Atmospheric scientist
- Organization(s): Science and Operations Officer at the National Hurricane Center
- Notable work: Atlantic hurricane reanalysis National Hurricane Center: Hurricanes, Typhoons, and Tropical Cyclones: FAQ
- Awards: American Meteorological Society's Banner I. Miller award (May 1993); 2007 NOAA Administrator's Award; United States Department of Commerce Bronze Medal Award for Superior Federal Service (Oct 2000) (co-recipient)

Christopher William Landsea is an American meteorologist, formerly a research meteorologist with the Hurricane Research Division of the Atlantic Oceanographic and Meteorological Laboratory at NOAA, and now the Science and Operations Officer at the National Hurricane Center. He is a member of the American Geophysical Union and the American Meteorological Society.

== Research and achievements ==
Landsea earned his doctoral degree in Atmospheric Science at Colorado State University. He served as chair of the American Meteorological Society's Committee on Tropical Meteorology and Tropical Cyclone. Landsea was recognized with the American Meteorological Society's Banner I. Miller award for "best contribution to the science of hurricane and tropical weather forecasting."

Over the years Landsea's work has involved the general hurricane FAQ currently on the Atlantic Oceanographic and Meteorological Laboratory website and the Atlantic hurricane reanalysis. Landsea has contributed to Science, Bulletin of the American Meteorological Society, Journal of Climate, and Nature. He has been vocal on the lack of a link between global warming and current hurricane intensity change.

Landsea has published a number of research papers on cyclones and hurricanes. He is the author of Hurricanes, Typhoons, and Tropical Cyclones: FAQ. He also has been the lead scientist in the Atlantic hurricane reanalysis since 1997.

== On global warming and hurricanes ==
In January, 2005, Landsea withdrew from his participation in the IPCC Fourth Assessment Report, criticizing it for using "a process that I view as both being motivated by pre-conceived agendas and being scientifically unsound." Landsea claimed the IPCC had become politicized and the leadership ignored his concerns.

Landsea does not consider that global warming has a strong influence on hurricanes: "global warming might be enhancing hurricane winds but only by 1 percent or 2 percent".

According to Salon magazine, Bush administration personnel chose Landsea over another scientists at NOAA to speak to the news media about the link between hurricanes and climate change after Hurricane Katrina devastated New Orleans.

In an interview on PBS, Landsea said "we certainly see substantial warming in the ocean and atmosphere over the last several decades on the order of a degree Fahrenheit and I have no doubt a portion of that, at least, is due to greenhouse warming. The question is whether we're seeing any real increases in the hurricane activity." He went on to say "with the Atlantic hurricanes in particular, they're due to changes both in the ocean as well as the atmosphere. Just changing the ocean where it's a little bit warmer isn't sufficient." As for climate change affecting hurricane strength, Landsea said that global warming theories and numerical modeling suggest only that "hurricanes like Katrina and Rita may have been stronger due to global warming but maybe by one or two miles per hour."

== Awards ==
- 2007 NOAA Administrator's Award for "establishing and administrating the Joint Hurricane Testbed, NOAA's first U.S. Weather Research Program testbed, accelerating research into operations, greatly improving forecasts."
- United States Department of Commerce Bronze Medal Award for Superior Federal Service (Oct 2000)(co-recipient) for "issuing the accurate and first official physically based Atlantic Seasonal Hurricane Outlooks for the 1998/1999 seasons, based upon new research"
- American Meteorological Society's Banner I. Miller Award (May 1993)(co-recipient) for the "best contribution to the science of hurricane and tropical weather forecasting published during the years 1990 - 1992."
