= Atlantic hurricane reanalysis project =

Project to add new information about past North Atlantic hurricanes

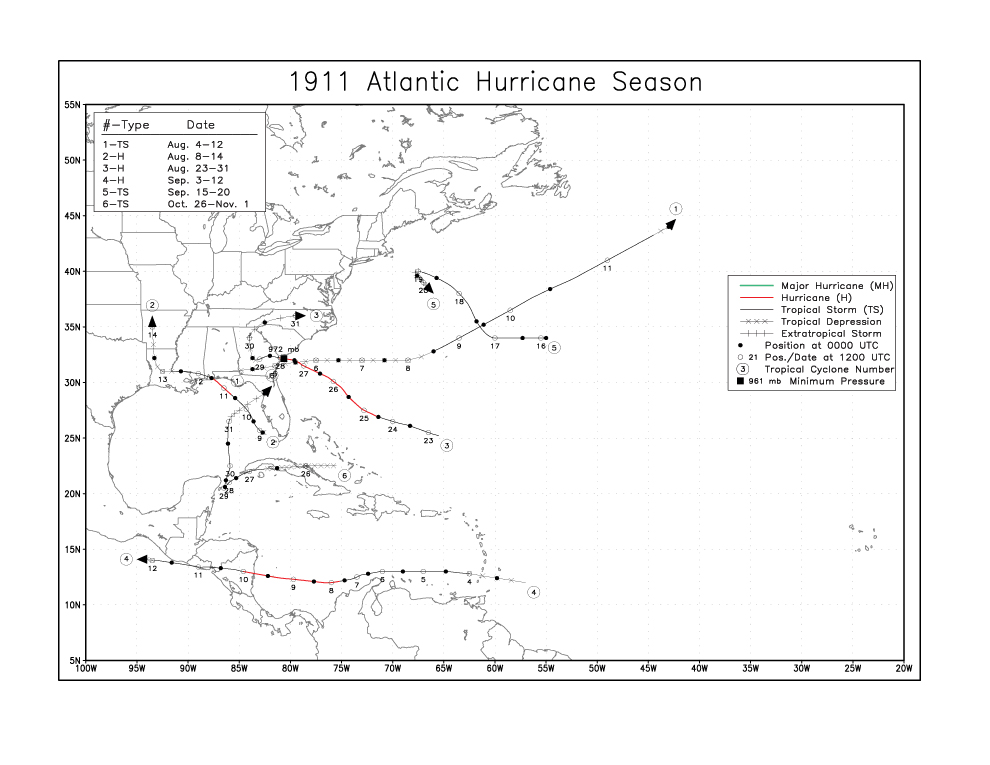
Reanalyzed 1911 Atlantic hurricane season

The Atlantic hurricane reanalysis project of the National Oceanic and Atmospheric Administration seeks to correct and add new information about past North Atlantic hurricanes. It was started around 2000 to update HURDAT, the official hurricane database for the Atlantic Basin, which has become outdated since its creation due to various systematic errors introduced into the database over time. This effort has involved reanalyses of ship observations from the International Comprehensive Ocean-Atmosphere Data Set (ICOADS) as well as reanalyses done by other researchers over the years. It is ongoing as of 2025.

== Inaccuracies and omissions in existing data ==
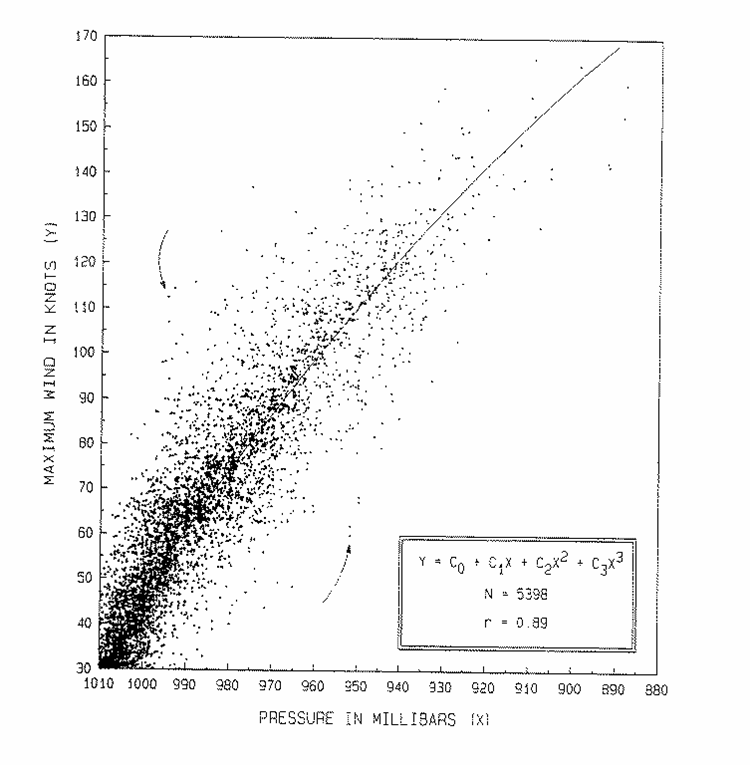
Arrows point to storms with unlikely wind/pressure relationships in HURDAT

=== Errors ===
HURDAT contains a number of errors which need to be corrected, such demonstrated by the outliers in the a pressure vs. wind speed graph of datapoints in the database (right). Some of these errors have existed since the database's creation during NASA's Apollo Program, where it was used to help produce probabilities of tropical cyclone-induced winds in critical areas such as Cape Kennedy (now Cape Canaveral).

=== New information ===
A significant amount of new data for systems between 1851 and 1886 became available after a major basin-wide reanalysis in 1996, a project led by Jose Fernandez-Paratagas with the collaboration of Henry Diaz. The new data was constructed using old newspaper articles and the hemispheric weather map series. Hurricane histories for individual states had been constructed by the 1990s as well, which proposed new storms and increased the knowledge of tropical cyclones already in the database. Due to this profusion of relevant information not included in HURDAT, and evolving definitions for tropical and subtropical cyclones over the decades, the project was started around 2000 to update the official database. Since then, the International Comprehensive Ocean-Atmosphere Data Set has been utilized to check for older ship reports which were either not utilized nor available to previous researchers.

=== Incompleteness of dataset ===
As early as 1957, it was recognized that an increasing trend in the number of tropical cyclones each season in the Atlantic basin was at least partially tied to increasing observations and better records. By analyzing the density of ship tracks over time, it has been estimated that between 1900 and 1966, an average of two storms per year are missing from HURDAT. This is mainly due to a lack of satellite imagery and lack of reconnaissance aircraft prior to 1943. An additional storm per year is likely missing prior to the advent of new technologies. These technologies include satellite-derived Quikscat winds, satellite-derived temperature profile information, and Robert Hart's cyclone phase space diagrams, which have led to a recent increase in tropical cyclone detection. Quikscat was launched in 1999, and has been credited with allowing Chantal to be named during the 2007 Atlantic hurricane season. The last two help determine whether or not a low pressure area is an extratropical cyclone, subtropical cyclone, or tropical cyclone.

Christopher Landsea noted that the efforts to reanalyze the Atlantic hurricane database

will not be able to recover observations of open ocean tropical cyclones that were just never taken. Researchers cannot assume that the Atlantic tropical cyclone database presents a complete depiction of frequency of events before the advent of satellite imagery in the mid-1960s. Moreover, newly available advanced tools and techniques are also contributing toward monitoring about one additional Atlantic tropical cyclone per year since 2002. Thus large, long-term 'trends' in tropical cyclone frequency are primarily manifestations of increased monitoring capabilities and likely not related to any real change in the climate in which they develop.

The IPCC report from 2007 noted on older datasets, "The historical record typically records the central pressure and the maximum winds, but these turn out not to be physically consistent in older records, mainly prior to about the early 1970s. However, attempts at mutual adjustments result in increases in some years and decreases in others, with little effect on overall trends." However, scientist also point out that many storms remain under reported, especially those not making landfall, or staying in the open ocean. The emerging studies of geological proxies in paleotempestology however can help to bring more trends to light, by for instance assessing sediments proxies from storm surge.

== Progress ==
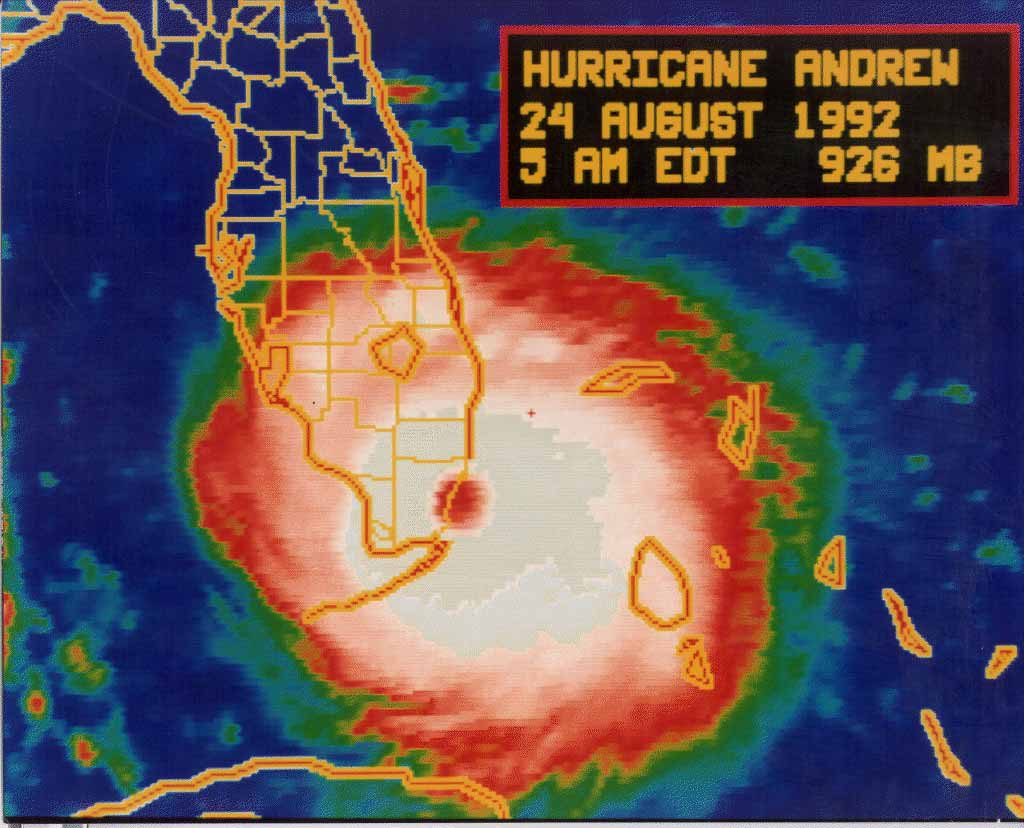
Hurricane Andrew over South Florida as a Category 5 hurricane

The project ranks the year 1914 as the quietest hurricane season ever for the Atlantic basin with just one tropical storm. As of January 2022 the project has reanalyzed storms from the period 1886–1970 and has extended HURDAT back to 1851. In 2001, data for the years 1851–1885 were added to the official database from the Fernández-Partagás series of publications. Also, a paleotempestology conference was held at the University of South Carolina which proposed to increase the scope of HURDAT from a starting year of 1851 to a start of 1800. The conference also discussed ways of exchanging information for the inclusion of older tropical cyclones, such as via compact disc or a Wikipedia-style website. While the reanalysis has mostly proceeded sequentially, notable exceptions have been made for the reanalysis of some significant tropical cyclones. In 2002, for the tenth anniversary of Hurricane Andrew, the reanalysis was completed for the hurricane, which upgraded the cyclone to a Category 5 hurricane. In 2014, a similar reanalysis was completed for Hurricane Camille. In 2022, the Great Atlantic hurricane of 1944 was also upgraded to a Category 5.

Work by Michael Chenoweth, in collaboration with Cary Mock, increased knowledge of tropical cyclones in the Caribbean Sea for 1750 to 1786. In 2006, Chenoweth completed and published a basin-wide reassessment for old source material from the 1700 to 1855 period by using surface weather observations mainly in the form of ship reports, newspapers, and various diaries and journals from the region around the Caribbean Sea. In 2014, Michael Chenoweth and Dmitry Divine completed and published an Atlantic basin-wide reassessment for the 1851–1898 period as well.

=== Future efforts in other basins ===
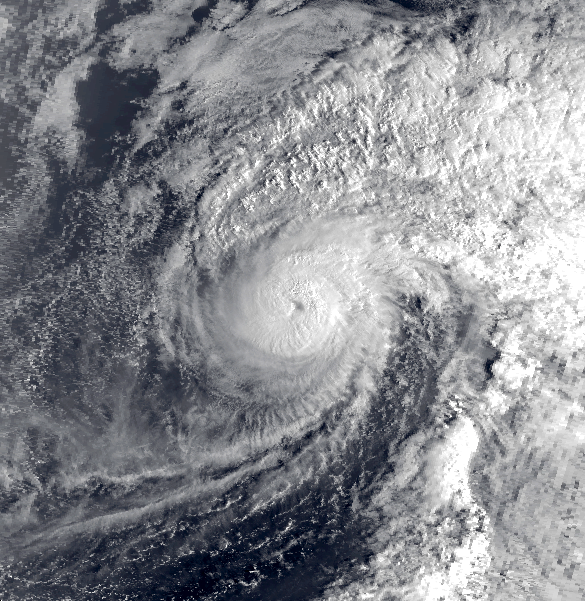
Typhoon Freda (1981), in Joint Typhoon Warning Center database as 100 knots (190 km/h) while Dvorak estimates were 115 knots (213 km/h)

There is agreement within tropical cyclone circles of doing an "Atlantic-style" reanalysis for other ocean basins. Some efforts are underway to start similar reanalyses across the western and eastern north Pacific Ocean, but are likely to take longer to complete. This is due to the need for coordination between the multiple Regional Specialized Meteorological Centres, which have the responsibility for tracking and forecasting tropical cyclones across that ocean. During February 2016, the NHC released the 1959 Mexico hurricane's reanalysis, which was the first system outside the Atlantic basin to be reassessed using methods developed for the Atlantic reanalysis process.

== See also ==
- HURDAT (online database)
- Outline of tropical cyclones
- Tropical cyclones and climate change
