= List of Category 1 Atlantic hurricanes =

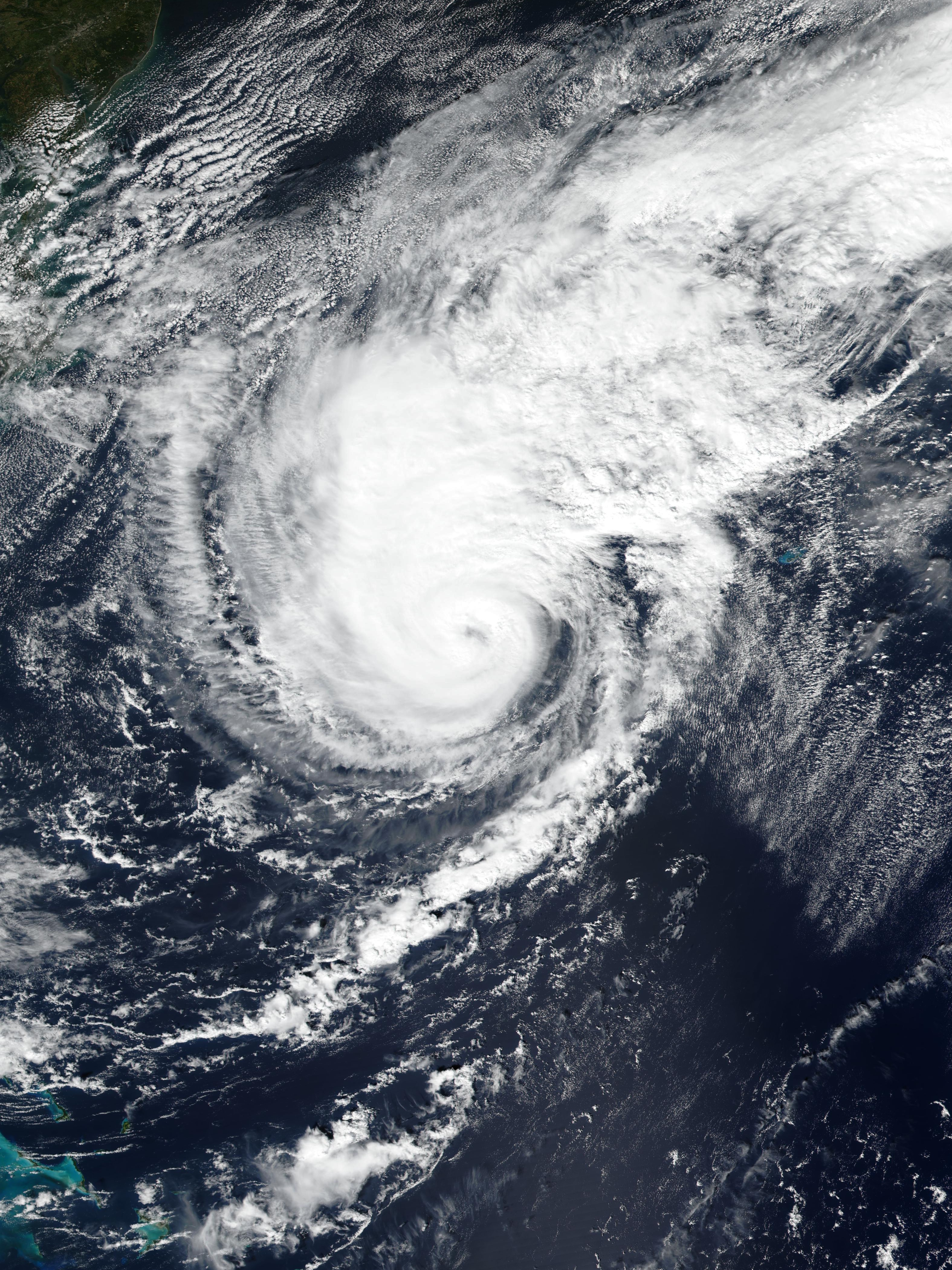
Hurricane Imelda is the most recent Category 1 hurricane as of October 2025. It is shown at its peak intensity of 90 mph (150 km/h) and minimum pressure of 966 mb (28.53 inHg) in the image above.

A Category 1 Atlantic hurricane is an Atlantic hurricane that reaches category 1 strength, which is the lowest hurricane classification on the Saffir–Simpson scale. When a storm's wind speed is between 64 and 82 knots (74 and 94 mph; 119 and 152 km/h; 33 and 42 m/s), it is classified as a Category 1. Since records began in 1851, 358 tropical cyclones have peaked at this intensity.

== Background ==
Since HURDAT began in 1851, all tropical cyclones of at least tropical storm intensity were tracked by the National Hurricane Center. In 1971, the Saffir–Simpson scale was devised by Herbert Saffir and Robert Simpson. Category 1 was designed as the lowest hurricane category on the scale.

== Systems ==
=== 1850s ===
Name	Duration	Peak intensity		Areas affected	Damage (USD)	Deaths	Refs
Name	Duration	Wind speed	Pressure	Areas affected	Damage (USD)	Deaths	Refs
One	June 25 – 28, 1851	90 mph (150 km/h)	Not Specified	Texas, Mexico	Unknown	1	
Two	July 5 – 6, 1851	90 mph (150 km/h)	Not Specified	Texas, Mexico	Unknown	Unknown	
San Lorenzo	September 5 – 6, 1852	80 mph (130 km/h)	Not Specified	Puerto Rico, Hispaniola	Unknown	≥100	
Three	September 9 – 13, 1852	80 mph (130 km/h)	985 hPa (29.09 inHg)	Florida, The Bahamas	Unknown	Unknown	
Four	September 22 – 30, 1852	90 mph (150 km/h)	Not Specified	Greater Antilles	Unknown	Unknown	
Six	September 26 – October 1, 1853	80 mph (130 km/h)	Not Specified	Bermuda	Unknown	Unknown	
One	July 25 – 27, 1854	80 mph (130 km/h)	Not Specified	Texas, Mexico	Unknown	Unknown	
Three	August 11, 1855	80 mph (130 km/h)	Not Specified	None	None	None	
Two	August 13 – 14, 1856	80 mph (130 km/h)	Not Specified	Barbados, Grenada, Windward Islands	Unknown	None	
Six	September 18 – 22, 1856	80 mph (130 km/h)	Not Specified	None	None	None	
Three	September 20 – 26, 1857	80 mph (130 km/h)	Not Specified	None	None	None	
One	June 12, 1858	80 mph (130 km/h)	Not Specified	None	None	None	
Two	August 5, 1858	80 mph (130 km/h)	Not Specified	None	None	None	
Four	September 17 – 24, 1858	90 mph (150 km/h)	Not Specified	None	None	None	
Five	September 22 – 25, 1858	90 mph (150 km/h)	Not Specified	Cuba, Haiti, The Bahamas	None	None	
Three	September 2 – 3, 1859	80 mph (130 km/h)	Not Specified	Lesser Antilles	None	None	
Four	September 12 – 13, 1859	105 mph (165 km/h)	Not Specified	United States Gulf Coast, United States East Coast	Unknown	Unknown	
Five	September 15 – 18, 1859	80 mph (130 km/h)	982 hPa (29.00 inHg)	Southeastern United States, Eastern United States	$10,000	2	
Eight	October 24 – 29, 1859	90 mph (150 km/h)	989 hPa (29.21 inHg)	Mexico, Florida	Unknown	Unknown	

=== 1860-1899 ===
Name	Dates	Peak intensity		Areas affected	Deaths	Damage (USD)	Refs
Name	Dates	Wind speed	Pressure	Areas affected	Deaths	Damage (USD)	Refs
Three	September 11, 1860	80 mph (130 km/h)	Unknown	None	0	None	
Two	August 13 – 17, 1861	90 mph (150 km/h)	978 hPa (28.88 inHg)	Hispaniola, The Bahamas, Cuba, Florida	0	Unknown	
Four	September 17, 1861	80 mph (130 km/h)	Unknown	None	0	None	
Five	September 27 – 28, 1861	80 mph (130 km/h)	978 hPa (28.88 inHg)	United States East Coast	0	Unknown	
Expedition	November 1 – 3, 1861	80 mph (130 km/h)	985 hPa (29.09 inHg)	United States East Coast	0	Unknown	
Five	October 14 – 16, 1862	80 mph (130 km/h)	Unknown	New England	3	Unknown	
Five	September 9 – 16, 1863	80 mph (130 km/h)	Unknown	Bermuda	0	None	
One	July 16 – 18, 1864	80 mph (130 km/h)	Not Specified	Bermuda	Unknown	Unknown	
Three	August 26 – September 1, 1864	80 mph (130 km/h)	Unknown	Leeward Islands, Central America	0	None	
Five	October 22 – 24, 1864	80 mph (130 km/h)	Unknown	None	0	None	
Three	September 4 – 7, 1866	80 mph (130 km/h)	Unknown	Bermuda, Newfoundland and Labrador	0	Minimal	
Four	September 18 – 20, 1866	80 mph (130 km/h)	Unknown	None	0	None	
One	June 21 – 23, 1867	80 mph (130 km/h)	985 hPa (29.09 inHg)	United States East Coast	0	None	
Four	August 31 – September 3, 1867	80 mph (130 km/h)	Unknown	New England	0	None	
Five	September 4 – 6, 1869	80 mph (130 km/h)	985 hPa (29.09 inHg)	Louisiana	0	Unknown	
The Mobile Hurricane of 1870	July 30, 1870	80 mph (130 km/h)	985 hPa (29.09 inHg)	Alabama, Florida, Louisiana	Unknown	$200,000	
Five	September 17 – 19, 1870	90 mph (150 km/h)	969 hPa (28.61 inHg)	None	0	None	
Seven	October 7, 1870	80 mph (130 km/h)	Unknown	None	0	None	
Eight	October 10 – 11, 1870	80 mph (130 km/h)	Unknown	None	0	None	
Eleven	October 30 – November 3, 1870	80 mph (130 km/h)	Unknown	Central America, Cuba, Florida	0	Unknown	
Six	September 5 – 8, 1871	80 mph (130 km/h)	Unknown	Florida	0	Unknown	
Seven	September 30 – October 7, 1871	80 mph (130 km/h)	Unknown	Gulf Coast of the United States	0	Unknown	
Eight	October 10 – 13, 1871	80 mph (130 km/h)	Unknown	Nova Scotia	0	Unknown	
Three	September 9 – 20, 1872	80 mph (130 km/h)	Unknown	Windward Islands	0	Unknown	
Four	September 30 – October 6, 1872	80 mph (130 km/h)	Unknown	None	0	None	
Five	October 22 – 27, 1872	80 mph (130 km/h)	Unknown	Gulf of Mexico, United States East Coast	0	Unknown	
Three	September 18 – 20, 1873	80 mph (130 km/h)	985 hPa (29.09 inHg)	Gulf of Mexico, Florida, Georgia	0	Unknown	
Two	August 3 – 7, 1874	80 mph (130 km/h)	Unknown	Bermuda	0	Unknown	
Three	August 29 – September 7, 1874	90 mph (150 km/h)	980 hPa (28.94 inHg)	Newfoundland and Labrador	0	Unknown	
Six	September 25 – 30, 1874	90 mph (150 km/h)	981 hPa (28.97 inHg)	Gulf of Mexico	0	Unknown	
One	August 16 – 19, 1875	80 mph (130 km/h)	Unknown	None	0	None	
Two	September 1 – 10, 1875	80 mph (130 km/h)	982 hPa (29.00 inHg)	None	0	None	
Six	October 12 – 16, 1875	80 mph (130 km/h)	Unknown	United States East Coast	0	Unknown	
One	September 9 – 11, 1876	90 mph (150 km/h)	970 hPa (28.64 inHg)	Bermuda, Nova Scotia	0	None	
Two	September 14 – 21, 1877	80 mph (130 km/h)	985 hPa (29.09 inHg)	Gulf Coast of the United States	0	Unknown	
Three	September 16 – 22, 1877	80 mph (130 km/h)	Unknown	Atlantic Canada	0	None	
Two	August 8 – 19, 1878	80 mph (130 km/h)	Unknown	Leeward Islands, Gulf of Mexico	Unknown	Unknown	
Three	August 19 – 20, 1878	90 mph (150 km/h)	963 hPa (28.44 inHg)	Atlantic Canada	0	None	
Eight	October 9 – 14, 1878	80 mph (130 km/h)	982 hPa (29.00 inHg)	United States East Coast	27	None	
Nine	October 9 – 15, 1878	80 mph (130 km/h)	Unknown	None	0	None	
One	August 9 – 12, 1879	80 mph (130 km/h)	Unknown	United States East Coast	0	Unknown	
Seven	October 24 – 29, 1879	80 mph (130 km/h)	Unknown	United States East Coast	0	Unknown	
Three	August 15 – 20, 1880	90 mph (150 km/h)	980 hPa (28.94 inHg)	Lesser Antilles	0	Unknown	
Five	August 26 – September 4, 1880	90 mph (150 km/h)	977 hPa (28.85 inHg)	None	0	None	
Six	September 6 – 10, 1880	80 mph (130 km/h)	987 hPa (29.15 inHg)	Florida	0	Unknown	
Seven	September 8 – 10, 1880	90 mph (150 km/h)	982 hPa (29.00 inHg)	Newfoundland and Labrador	0	Unknown	
Nine	October 5 – 10, 1880	80 mph (130 km/h)	985 hPa (29.09 inHg)	Gulf of Mexico	0	Unknown	
Ten	October 10 – 14, 1880	90 mph (150 km/h)	970 hPa (28.64 inHg)	None	0	Unknown	
Three	August 11 – 18, 1881	90 mph (150 km/h)	Unknown	None	0	None	
Four	August 16 – 21, 1881	80 mph (130 km/h)	Unknown	Yucatán Peninsula, Cuba, Florida, The Bahamas	Unknown	Unknown	
One	August 24 – 25, 1882	80 mph (130 km/h)	Unknown	None	0	None	
Five	September 24 – 28, 1882	80 mph (130 km/h)	Unknown	None	0	None	
One	August 18 – 27, 1883	90 mph (150 km/h)	975 hPa (28.79 inHg)	None	0	None	
One	September 1 – 2, 1884	80 mph (130 km/h)	997 hPa (29.44 inHg)	Newfoundland and Labrador	0	None	
Three	September 10 – 19, 1884	90 mph (150 km/h)	979 hPa (28.91 inHg)	The Bahamas, Florida, Georgia	0	Unknown	
One	August 7 – 13, 1885	90 mph (150 km/h)	981 hPa (28.97 inHg)	Bermuda	0	Unknown	
Four	September 17 – 23, 1885	90 mph (150 km/h)	973 hPa (28.73 inHg)	Gulf Coast of the United States, United States East Coast	4	Unknown	
Five	September 18 – 21, 1885	80 mph (130 km/h)	999 hPa (29.50 inHg)	Lesser Antilles	0	Unknown	
Six	September 24 – October 2, 1885	80 mph (130 km/h)	Unknown	Gulf Coast of the United States	Unknown	Unknown	
Seven	September 26 – 29, 1885	90 mph (150 km/h)	982 hPa (29.00 inHg)	None	0	None	
Four	July 14 – 22, 1886	85 mph (140 km/h)	990 hPa (29.23 inHg)	Yucatán Peninsula, Cuba, Florida	Unknown	Unknown	
Ten	September 14 – 18, 1887	80 mph (130 km/h)	983 hPa (29.03 inHg)	Newfoundland and Labrador	0	None	
Thirteen	October 9 – 20, 1887	85 mph (140 km/h)	981 hPa (28.97 inHg)	Lesser Antilles, United States East Coast	Unknown	Unknown	
Fourteen	October 10 – 12, 1887	85 mph (140 km/h)	989 hPa (29.21 inHg)	None	0	None	
Seventeen	November 27 – December 4, 1887	80 mph (130 km/h)	Unknown	The Bahamas	0	Unknown	
Eighteen	December 4 – 8, 1887	80 mph (130 km/h)	Unknown	None	0	None	
One	June 16 – 18, 1888	80 mph (130 km/h)	985 hPa (29.09 inHg)	Texas	Unknown	Unknown	
Six	September 23 – 26, 1888	80 mph (130 km/h)	985 hPa (29.09 inHg)	United States East Coast	Unknown	Unknown	
One	May 16 – 21, 1889	80 mph (130 km/h)	Unknown	None	0	None	
Two	June 15 – 20, 1889	75 mph (120 km/h)	Unknown	Cuba, Yucatán Peninsula, United States East Coast	Unknown	Unknown	
Three	August 18 – 28, 1889	80 mph (130 km/h)	998 hPa (29.47 inHg)	Hispaniola, The Bahamas	Unknown	Unknown	
Five	September 2 – 11, 1889	80 mph (130 km/h)	Unknown	None	0	None	
Four	October 31 – November 1, 1890	90 mph (150 km/h)	Unknown	Central America	Unknown	Unknown	
One	July 3 – 8, 1891	90 mph (150 km/h)	977 hPa (28.85 inHg)	Gulf Coast of the United States	10	Unknown	
Two	August 17 – 29, 1891	80 mph (130 km/h)	997 hPa (29.44 inHg)	Cape Verde	0	None	
Nine	October 12 – 20, 1891	85 mph (140 km/h)	992 hPa (29.29 inHg)	Windward Islands, Virgin Islands, Newfoundland and Labrador	Unknown	Unknown	
Two	August 15 – 21, 1892	75 mph (120 km/h)	Unknown	Leeward Islands	Unknown	Unknown	
Eight	October 13 – 17, 1892	90 mph (150 km/h)	Unknown	None	0	None	
One	June 10 – 19, 1893	80 mph (130 km/h)	990 hPa (29.23 inHg)	Gulf Coast of the United States, United States East Coast	Unknown	Unknown	
Two	September 10 – 13, 1897	85 mph (140 km/h)	981 hPa (28.97 inHg)	Louisiana, Texas	29	$150,000	
Five	October 9 – 21, 1897	80 mph (130 km/h)	993 hPa (29.32 inHg)	Cuba, The Bahamas, North Carolina, New England	188	Unknown	
One	August 2 – 3, 1898	80 mph (130 km/h)	982 hPa (29.00 inHg)	The Bahamas, Florida, Alabama	12	Unknown	
Two	August 30 – September 1, 1898	85 mph (140 km/h)	980 hPa (28.94 inHg)	Georgia	Unknown	$400,000	
Three	September 3 – 5, 1898	80 mph (130 km/h)	Unknown	None	0	None	

=== 1900-1920 ===
Name	Duration	Peak intensity		Areas affected	Damage (USD)	Deaths	Refs
Name	Duration	Wind speed	Pressure	Areas affected	Damage (USD)	Deaths	Refs
Three	July 4 – 13, 1901	80 mph (130 km/h)	Not Specified	Greater Antiles, The Bahamas, United States East Coast	Unknown	Unknown	
Four	August 2 – 18, 1901	90 mph (150 km/h)	973 hPa (28.73 inHg)	The Bahamas, United States Gulf Coast	Unknown	Unknown	
Six	August 25 – 30, 1901	80 mph (130 km/h)	Not Specified	Cape Verde	Unknown	Unknown	
Eight	September 9 – 18, 1901	80 mph (130 km/h)	Not Specified	The Caribbean, South Eastern United States	Unknown	Unknown	
Thirteen	October 30 – November 5, 1901	80 mph (130 km/h)	Not Specified	None	None	None	
Two	June 21 – 28, 1902	80 mph (130 km/h)	Not Specified	Mexico, Eastern United States	Unknown	Unknown	
One	July 21 – 26, 1903	80 mph (130 km/h)	Not Specified	The Bahamas, Bermuda	Unknown	Unknown	
Three	September 9 – 16, 1903	90 mph (150 km/h)	976 hPa (28.82 inHg)	The Bahamas, United States Gulf Coast	$500,000	14	
Ten	November 17 – 25, 1903	80 mph (130 km/h)	Not Specified	None	None	None	
One	June 10 – 14, 1904	80 mph (130 km/h)	Not Specified	Jamaica, Cuba, The Bahamas	Unknown	Unknown	
Two	September 8 – 15, 1904	80 mph (130 km/h)	985 hPa (29.09 inHg)	United States East Coast	$500,000	27	
Three	September 28 – October 4, 1904	80 mph (130 km/h)	Not Specified	Central America	Unknown	Unknown	
Four	October 12 – 21, 1904	80 mph (130 km/h)	Not Specified	Cuba, Florida, The Bahamas	Unknown	Unknown	
Five	September 3 – 18, 1906	90 mph (150 km/h)	977 hPa (28.85 inHg)	United States East Coast	$20,000	7	
Eleven	November 5 – 9, 1906	80 mph (130 km/h)	Not Specified	Cuba, The Bahamas	Unknown	Unknown	
Two	May 24 – 31, 1908	75 mph (120 km/h)	989 hPa (29.21 inHg)	The Bahamas, United States East Coast	Unknown	Unknown	
Three	July 24 – August 3, 1908	80 mph (130 km/h)	Not Specified	The Bahamas, United States East Coast	Unknown	Unknown	
Two	August 8 – 14, 1911	80 mph (130 km/h)	Not Specified	United States Gulf Coast	$12,600	Unknown	
Four	September 10 – 15, 1912	90 mph (150 km/h)	986 hPa (29.12 inHg)	United States Gulf Coast	$39,000	Unknown	
Five	October 3 – 10, 1912	90 mph (150 km/h)	Not Specified	Bermuda	Unknown	Unknown	
One	June 21 – 29, 1913	75 mph (120 km/h)	Not Specified	Central America	Unknown	Unknown	
Four	August 30 – September 4, 1913	85 mph (140 km/h)	976 hPa (28.82 inHg)	United States East Coast	$4 million	5	
Five	October 2 – 11, 1913	75 mph (120 km/h)	Not Specified	United States East Coast	$75 million	Unknown	
Six	October 28 – 30, 1913	75 mph (120 km/h)	Not Specified	Cuba	Unknown	Unknown	
One	July 31 – August 4, 1915	75 mph (120 km/h)	Not Specified	United States East Coast	$250,000	Unknown	
Eight	August 27 – September 2, 1916	80 mph (130 km/h)	986 hPa (29.12 inHg)	The Caribbean	Unknown	Unknown	
Ten	September 13 – 21, 1916	85 mph (140 km/h)	Not Specified	None	None	None	
Three	August 23 – 26, 1918	75 mph (120 km/h)	Not Specified	South Carolina	Unknown	Unknown	
Three	September 19 – 24, 1920	85 mph (140 km/h)	Not Specified	Southeastern United States	Unknown	1	
Five	September 25 – 30, 1920	85 mph (140 km/h)	Not Specified	Florida	Unknown	1	

=== 1920s ===
Name	Duration	Peak intensity		Areas affected	Damage (USD)	Deaths	Refs
Name	Duration	Wind speed	Pressure	Areas affected	Damage (USD)	Deaths	Refs
One	June 16 – 26, 1921	90 mph (150 km/h)	980 hPa (28.94 inHg)	Central America, Gulf of Mexico	Unknown	None	
Two	September 4 – 8, 1921	80 mph (130 km/h)	985 hPa (29.09 inHg)	Mexico	$19 million	215	
Four	September 8 – 14, 1921	90 mph (150 km/h)	979 hPa (28.91 inHg)	None	None	None	
Three	September 18 – 24, 1922	80 mph (130 km/h)	987 hPa (29.15 inHg)	None	None	None	
Four	September 10 – 13, 1923	80 mph (130 km/h)	986 hPa (29.12 inHg)	Newfoundland	None	None	
Six	October 12 – 17, 1923	80 mph (130 km/h)	983 hPa (29.03 inHg)	Mexico, Gulf Coast of the United States	Unknown	None	
Five	September 13 – 17, 1924	85 mph (140 km/h)	980 hPa (28.94 inHg)	United States East Coast	Unknown	Unknown	
Eleven	November 5 – 14, 1924	80 mph (130 km/h)	994 hPa (29.35 inHg)	Cuba, The Bahamas	Unknown	Unknown	
One	August 18 – 24, 1925	80 mph (130 km/h)	994 hPa (29.35 inHg)	None	None	None	
Two	September 2 – 11, 1927	90 mph (150 km/h)	1,007 hPa (29.74 inHg)	Cape Verde	None	None	
Three	September 22 – 29, 1927	80 mph (130 km/h)	1,005 hPa (29.68 inHg)	None	$4.36 million	19	
1928 Haiti hurricane	August 7 – 17, 1928	90 mph (150 km/h)	998 hPa (29.47 inHg)	Windward Islands, Leeward Islands, Gulf Coast of the United States	$2 million	210	
Six	September 10 – 15, 1928	90 mph (150 km/h)	980 hPa (28.94 inHg)	None	None	None	
One	June 27 — 30, 1929	90 mph (150 km/h)	982 hPa (29.00 inHg)	Gulf of Mexico	$365 thousand	Unknown	
Five	October 19 – 22, 1929	80 mph (130 km/h)	997 hPa (29.44 inHg)	None	None	None	

=== 1930-2010 ===
Name	Duration	Peak intensity		Areas affected	Damage (USD)	Deaths	Refs
Name	Duration	Wind speed	Pressure	Areas affected	Damage (USD)	Deaths	Refs
Eight	September 23 – 28, 1931	75 mph (120 km/h)	987 hPa (29.15 inHg)	None	None	None	
1932 Florida–Alabama hurricane	August 26 – September 2, 1932	85 mph (140 km/h)	979 hPa (28.91 inHg)	United States Gulf Coast	$226 thousand	Unknown	
1933 Florida–Mexico hurricane	July 23 – August 5, 1933	90 mph (150 km/h)	975 hPa (28.79 inHg)	Leeward Islands, United States Gulf Coast, Mexico	$500 thousand	Unknown	
Fifteen	September 24 – 27, 1933	75 mph (120 km/h)	991 hPa (29.26 inHg)	Azores	None	None	
Eighteen	October 25 – November 7, 1933	90 mph (150 km/h)	982 hPa (29.00 inHg)	Cuba, The Bahamas	$3 million	23	
Two	July 12 – 16, 1934	90 mph (150 km/h)	980 hPa (28.94 inHg)	Bermuda, Newfoundland and Labrador	None	None	
Three	July 22 – 26, 1934	85 mph (140 km/h)	975 hPa (28.79 inHg)	United States Gulf Coast	Unknown	Unknown	
Five	August 26 – September 1, 1934	80 mph (130 km/h)	989 hPa (29.21 inHg)	United States Gulf Coast	Unknown	Unknown	
1935 Jérémie hurricane	October 18 – 27, 1935	85 mph (140 km/h)	988 hPa (29.18 inHg)	Central America, Jamaica, Cuba, Haiti	$16 million	2,150	
Three	June 26 – 28, 1936	80 mph (130 km/h)	987 hPa (29.15 inHg)	Texas	$550 thousand	Unknown	
Eight	August 15 – 20, 1936	75 mph (120 km/h)	999 hPa (29.50 inHg)	Yucatán Peninsula, Tamaulipas	Unknown	None	
Eleven	August 28 – 30, 1936	80 mph (130 km/h)	1,000 hPa (29.53 inHg)	Yucatán Peninsula, Veracruz	Unknown	None	
Eleven	October 19 – 21, 1937	80 mph (130 km/h)	995 hPa (29.38 inHg)	None	None	None	
Two	August 7 – 19, 1939	75 mph (120 km/h)	985 hPa (29.09 inHg)	Puerto Rico, Turks and Caicos Islands, The Bahamas, Eastern United States	$2 thousand	None	
Six	October 28 – November 6, 1939	90 mph (150 km/h)	989 hPa (29.21 inHg)	Honduras, The Caribbean, Bermuda	Unknown	2	
Eight	October 20 – 24, 1940	80 mph (130 km/h)	993 hPa (29.32 inHg)	Nicaragua	Unknown	Unknown	
Three	September 18 – 25, 1941	80 mph (130 km/h)	978 hPa (28.88 inHg)	None	None	None	
Two	August 17 – 23, 1942	80 mph (130 km/h)	992 hPa (29.29 inHg)	Texas	$790 thousand	None	
One	July 13 – 18, 1944	80 mph (130 km/h)	995 hPa (29.38 inHg)	Bermuda	None	None	
Three	July 30 – August 4, 1944	80 mph (130 km/h)	985 hPa (29.09 inHg)	North Carolina, Mid-Atlantic states	$2 million	None	
Eight	September 19 – 22, 1944	80 mph (130 km/h)	996 hPa (29.41 inHg)	Mexico	Unknown	Unknown	
Twelve	October 11 – 15, 1944	80 mph (130 km/h)	998 hPa (29.47 inHg)	None	None	None	
Ten	October 2 – 7, 1945	90 mph (150 km/h)	982 hPa (29.00 inHg)	Belize, Guatemala, Honduras, Mexico	Unknown	1	
Two	July 5 – 9, 1946	80 mph (130 km/h)	1,005 hPa (29.68 inHg)	North Carolina	Minor	0	
Three	August 18 – 27, 1947	80 mph (130 km/h)	984 hPa (29.06 inHg)	Cuba, Louisiana, Texas	$800 thousand	1	
Five	September 1 – 7, 1948	80 mph (130 km/h)	983 hPa (29.03 inHg)	Louisiana, Mississippi, Midwestern United States	$900 thousand	0	
Ten	November 8 – 11, 1948	75 mph (120 km/h)	990 hPa (29.23 inHg)	None	None	None	
Ten	September 20 – 22, 1949	80 mph (130 km/h)	1,003 hPa (29.62 inHg)	Saint Croix, Puerto Rico, Dominican Republic	$1.012 million	15	
Thirteen	October 13 – 19, 1949	90 mph (150 km/h)	981 hPa (28.97 inHg)	Cuba, The Bahamas	Unknown	None	
Love	October 18 – 22, 1950	80 mph (130 km/h)	987 hPa (29.15 inHg)	Georgia, Louisiana, Southwestern Florida	Minimal	None	
Able	May 15 – 23, 1951	90 mph (150 km/h)	973 hPa (28.73 inHg)	Florida, Bahamas, North Carolina, South Carolina, Virginia	Minimal	None	
Dog	August 27 – September 5, 1951	90 mph (150 km/h)	992 hPa (29.29 inHg)	Martinique, Saint Lucia, Hispaniola, Jamaica	$3 million	7	
Jig	October 15 – 17, 1951	75 mph (120 km/h)	990 hPa (29.23 inHg)	North Carolina, Virginia	None	None	
Twelve	September 2 – 11, 1951	80 mph (130 km/h)	995 hPa (29.38 inHg)	None	None	None	
Barbara	August 11 – 15, 1953	90 mph (150 km/h)	973 hPa (28.73 inHg)	United States East Coast, Atlantic Canada	$1.3 million	9	
Dolly	September 8 – 12, 1953	75 mph (120 km/h)	989 hPa (29.21 inHg)	Virgin Islands, Puerto Rico, The Bahamas, Bermuda	Minimal	None	
Gail	October 2 – 12, 1953	80 mph (130 km/h)	986 hPa (29.12 inHg)	None	None	None	
Hazel	October 7 – 10, 1953	85 mph (140 km/h)	980 hPa (28.94 inHg)	Florida, Sable Island	$250 thousand	None	
Dolly	August 31 – September 2, 1954	85 mph (140 km/h)	994 hPa (29.35 inHg)	None	None	None	
Alice	December 30, 1954 – January 6, 1955	90 mph (150 km/h)	980 hPa (28.94 inHg)	Saba, Anguilla, Lesser Antilles	$623 thousand	None	
Gladys	September 3 – 6, 1955	90 mph (150 km/h)	996 hPa (29.41 inHg)	Western Mexico, Yucatán Peninsula	$500 thousand	None	
Anna	July 25 – 27, 1956	85 mph (140 km/h)	991 hPa (29.26 inHg)	Mexico	$50 thousand	None	
Flossy	September 20 – 25, 1956	90 mph (150 km/h)	974 hPa (28.76 inHg)	Yucatán Peninsula, Louisiana, Mississippi, Alabama, Florida, Georgia, South Carolina, North Carolina, Virginia	$24.9 million	15	
Frieda	September 20 – 26, 1957	85 mph (140 km/h)	975 hPa (28.79 inHg)	Bermuda, Newfoundland	None	None	
Fifi	September 4 – 11, 1958	85 mph (140 km/h)	1,000 hPa (29.53 inHg)	None	None	None	
Escuminac (Three)	June 18 – 19, 1959	85 mph (140 km/h)	974 hPa (28.76 inHg)	Florida, Atlantic Canada	$2.5 million	35	
Cindy	July 4 – 11, 1959	75 mph (120 km/h)	996 hPa (29.41 inHg)	The Carolinas, Mid-Atlantic states, New England, Canadian Maritime Provinces	$75 thousand	6	
Debra	July 22 – 27, 1959	85 mph (140 km/h)	984 hPa (29.06 inHg)	Texas, Oklahoma, United States Gulf Coast, Midwestern United States	$7 million	None	
Flora	September 9 – 12, 1959	75 mph (120 km/h)	994 hPa (29.35 inHg)	None	None	None	
Judith	October 14 – 22, 1959	85 mph (140 km/h)	988 hPa (29.18 inHg)	Florida	Minimal	None	
Abby	July 9 – 17, 1960	80 mph (130 km/h)	995 hPa (29.38 inHg)	Lesser Antilles, Puerto Rico, Leeward Antilles, Hispaniola, Jamaica, Nicaragua, Honduras, Belize, Guatemala, Mexico	$640 thousand	6	
Cleo	August 17 – 21, 1960	85 mph (140 km/h)	995 hPa (29.38 inHg)	Greater Antilles, The Bahamas, Northeastern United States, Nova Scotia	Minimal	None	
Debbie	September 6 – 16, 1961	90 mph (150 km/h)	975 hPa (28.79 inHg)	Cape Verde, Azores, Ireland, United Kingdom, Norway, Soviet Union	$50 million	78	
Jenny	November 1 – 10, 1961	80 mph (130 km/h)	974 hPa (28.76 inHg)	Puerto Rico, Leeward Islands	None	None	
Alma	August 26 – 30, 1962	85 mph (140 km/h)	984 hPa (29.06 inHg)	Puerto Rico, United States East Coast	$1 million	1	
Ten	November 28 – December 4, 1962	90 mph (150 km/h)	988 hPa (29.18 inHg)	United States East Coast	Unknown	None	
Four	September 9 – 14, 1963	80 mph (130 km/h)	990 hPa (29.23 inHg)	Bermuda	None	None	
Debra	September 19 – 24, 1963	75 mph (120 km/h)	999 hPa (29.50 inHg)	None	None	None	
Three	July 28 – August 2, 1964	85 mph (140 km/h)	990 hPa (29.23 inHg)	British Isles	None	None	
Carol	September 16 – 30, 1965	90 mph (150 km/h)	974 hPa (28.76 inHg)	Azores	None	None	
Becky	July 1 – 3, 1966	75 mph (120 km/h)	985 hPa (29.09 inHg)	None	None	None	
Celia	July 13 – 21, 1966	80 mph (130 km/h)	995 hPa (29.38 inHg)	Atlantic Canada, Quebec	None	None	
Dorothy	July 22 – 30, 1966	85 mph (140 km/h)	989 hPa (29.21 inHg)	None	None	None	
Lois	November 4 – 11, 1966	80 mph (130 km/h)	986 hPa (29.12 inHg)	Azores	None	None	
Arlene	August 28 – September 4, 1967	85 mph (140 km/h)	982 hPa (29.00 inHg)	Newfoundland	None	None	
Doria	September 8 – 21, 1967	85 mph (140 km/h)	973 hPa (28.73 inHg)	United States East Coast	$150 thousand	3	
Fern	October 1 – 4, 1967	85 mph (140 km/h)	987 hPa (29.15 inHg)	Mexico, Texas	Minimal	3	
Heidi	October 19 – 31, 1967	90 mph (150 km/h)	981 hPa (28.97 inHg)	Bermuda	Minimal	None	
Abby	June 1 – 13, 1968	75 mph (120 km/h)	992 hPa (29.29 inHg)	Cuba, Florida, Georgia, The Carolinas	$450,000	6	
Brenda	June 17 – 26, 1968	75 mph (120 km/h)	990 hPa (29.23 inHg)	Florida	Minor	None	
Dolly	August 10 – 17, 1968	80 mph (130 km/h)	985 hPa (29.09 inHg)	The Carolinas, Florida, Azores	Minor	None	
Blanche	August 11 – 12, 1969	85 mph (140 km/h)	997 hPa (29.44 inHg)	Sable Island	None	None	
Holly	September 14 – 21, 1969	85 mph (140 km/h)	984 hPa (29.06 inHg)	Leeward Islands	None	None	
Ten	September 21 – 26, 1969	75 mph (120 km/h)	985 hPa (29.09 inHg)	None	None	None	
Seventeen	October 31 – November 7, 1969	75 mph (120 km/h)	988 hPa (29.18 inHg)	None	None	None	
Martha	November 21 – 25, 1969	90 mph (150 km/h)	975 hPa (28.79 inHg)	Panama, Costa Rica	$30 million	5	
Alma	May 17 – 26, 1970	75 mph (120 km/h)	993 hPa (29.32 inHg)	Cayman Islands, Jamaica, Cuba, Southeastern United States	Minor	8	
Nineteen	October 20 – 28, 1970	80 mph (130 km/h)	988 hPa (29.18 inHg)	None	None	None	
Two	August 3 – 7, 1971	85 mph (140 km/h)	974 hPa (28.76 inHg)	None	None	None	
Beth	August 10 – 16, 1971	85 mph (140 km/h)	977 hPa (28.85 inHg)	The Bahamas, Florida, Nova Scotia, Newfoundland	$5.1 million	1	
Fern	September 3 – 13, 1971	90 mph (150 km/h)	979 hPa (28.91 inHg)	Louisiana, Texas, northern Mexico	$30.2 million	2	
Irene	September 11 – 20, 1971	80 mph (130 km/h)	989 hPa (29.21 inHg)	Lesser Antilles, Leeward Antilles, Central America	$1 million	3	
Agnes	June 14 – 23, 1972	90 mph (150 km/h)	977 hPa (28.85 inHg)	Yucatán Peninsula, western Cuba, Florida Panhandle, Georgia, North Carolina, Virginia, Maryland, Pennsylvania, New York, Atlantic Canada	$2.1 billion	128	
Dawn	September 5 – 14, 1972	80 mph (130 km/h)	997 hPa (29.44 inHg)	Southeastern United States	Minimal	None	
Alice	July 1 – 7, 1973	90 mph (150 km/h)	986 hPa (29.12 inHg)	Bermuda, Newfoundland	Minimal	None	
Brenda	August 18 – 22, 1973	90 mph (150 km/h)	977 hPa (28.85 inHg)	Cayman Islands, Mexico	Unknown	10	
Fran	October 8 – 12, 1973	80 mph (130 km/h)	978 hPa (28.88 inHg)	Azores	Minimal	None	
Gertrude	September 25 – October 4, 1974	75 mph (120 km/h)	999 hPa (29.50 inHg)	Windward Islands	Unknown	None	
Blanche	July 23 – 28, 1975	85 mph (140 km/h)	980 hPa (28.94 inHg)	Maine, Nova Scotia	$6.2 million	None	
Candice	August 18 – 24, 1976	90 mph (150 km/h)	964 hPa (28.47 inHg)	None	None	None	
Holly	October 22 – 28, 1976	75 mph (120 km/h)	990 hPa (29.23 inHg)	None	None	None	
Babe	September 3 – 9, 1977	75 mph (120 km/h)	995 hPa (29.38 inHg)	Florida, Louisiana, Alabama, Mississippi, Tennessee, Georgia, South Carolina, North Carolina and Virginia	$13 million	None	
Clara	September 5 – 11, 1977	75 mph (120 km/h)	993 hPa (29.32 inHg)	The Carolinas, Nova Scotia	Minimal	None	
Dorothy	September 26 – 29, 1977	85 mph (140 km/h)	980 hPa (28.94 inHg)	Bermuda, Newfoundland	None	None	
Evelyn	October 13 – 15, 1977	80 mph (130 km/h)	994 hPa (29.35 inHg)	Bermuda, Nova Scotia, Newfoundland	None	None	
Cora	August 7 – 12, 1978	90 mph (150 km/h)	980 hPa (28.94 inHg)	Windward Islands, St. Lucia, Barbados, Grenada	Minimal	1	
Kendra	October 28 – November 1, 1978	80 mph (130 km/h)	990 hPa (29.23 inHg)	Puerto Rico, United States East Coast	$6 million	1	
Bob	July 9 – 16, 1979	75 mph (120 km/h)	983 hPa (29.03 inHg)	Louisiana, Mississippi, Alabama, Midwestern United States	$20 million	1	
Henri	September 15 – 24, 1979	85 mph (140 km/h)	986 hPa (29.12 inHg)	Mexico, Florida	Minimal	None	
Charley	August 20 – 25, 1980	80 mph (130 km/h)	989 hPa (29.21 inHg)	North Carolina	None	7	
Georges	September 1 – 8, 1980	80 mph (130 km/h)	993 hPa (29.32 inHg)	Newfoundland	None	None	
Earl	September 4 – 10, 1980	75 mph (120 km/h)	985 hPa (29.09 inHg)	None	None	None	
Karl	November 25 – 28, 1980	85 mph (140 km/h)	985 hPa (29.09 inHg)	None	None	None	
Dennis	August 7 – 21, 1981	80 mph (130 km/h)	995 hPa (29.38 inHg)	Lesser Antilles, Greater Antilles, The Bahamas, Florida, Georgia, The Carolinas, Virginia	$15 million	0	
Emily	August 31 – September 11, 1981	90 mph (150 km/h)	966 hPa (28.53 inHg)	None	None	None	
Katrina	November 3 – 7, 1981	85 mph (140 km/h)	980 hPa (28.94 inHg)	Cayman Islands, Jamaica, Cuba, The Bahamas, Turks and Caicos Islands	Minimal	2	
Alberto	June 1 – 6, 1982	85 mph (140 km/h)	985 hPa (29.09 inHg)	Cuba, Florida	$85 million	23	
Barry	August 23 – 29, 1983	80 mph (130 km/h)	986 hPa (29.12 inHg)	Florida, Texas, Mexico	Minimal	None	
Chantal	September 10 – 15, 1983	75 mph (120 km/h)	994 hPa (29.35 inHg)	None	None	None	
Hortense	September 23 – October 2, 1984	75 mph (120 km/h)	993 hPa (29.32 inHg)	None	None	None	
Klaus	November 5 – 13, 1984	90 mph (150 km/h)	971 hPa (28.67 inHg)	Puerto Rico, Leeward Islands	$152 million	2	
Lili	December 12 – 24, 1984	80 mph (130 km/h)	980 hPa (28.94 inHg)	Puerto Rico, Hispaniola	Minimal	None	
Bob	July 21 – 26, 1985	75 mph (120 km/h)	1,002 hPa (29.59 inHg)	United States East Coast	$20 million	5	
Claudette	August 9 – 16, 1985	85 mph (140 km/h)	980 hPa (28.94 inHg)	Bermuda, Azores	None	None	
Danny	August 12 – 18, 1985	90 mph (150 km/h)	987 hPa (29.15 inHg)	Cuba, United States Gulf Coast, Tennessee, The Carolinas, Virginia	$100 million	5	
Juan	October 26 – November 21, 1985	85 mph (140 km/h)	971 hPa (28.67 inHg)	United States Gulf Coast, central United States, Canada	$1.5 billion	12	
Bonnie	June 23 – 26, 1986	85 mph (140 km/h)	992 hPa (29.29 inHg)	Texas, Louisiana, Southeastern United States	$42 million	5	
Charley	August 13 – 20, 1986	80 mph (130 km/h)	987 hPa (29.15 inHg)	United States East Coast, United Kingdom	$15 million	15	
Frances	November 16 – 21, 1986	85 mph (140 km/h)	1,000 hPa (29.53 inHg)	None	None	None	
Arlene	August 10 – 23, 1987	75 mph (120 km/h)	987 hPa (29.15 inHg)	The Bahamas, Bermuda	$8 thousand	None	
Floyd	October 9 – 13, 1987	75 mph (120 km/h)	993 hPa (29.32 inHg)	Cuba, Florida, The Bahamas	$500 thousand	1	
Debby	August 31 – September 8, 1988	75 mph (120 km/h)	991 hPa (29.26 inHg)	Mexico	Unknown	20	
Florence	September 7 – 11, 1988	80 mph (130 km/h)	982 hPa (29.00 inHg)	Yucatán Peninsula, Louisiana, Mississippi, Alabama, Florida	$2.9 million	1	
Chantal	July 30 – August 3, 1989	80 mph (130 km/h)	984 hPa (29.06 inHg)	Texas, Louisiana, Oklahoma, Midwestern United States	$100 million	13	
Felix	August 25 – September 9, 1989	85 mph (140 km/h)	979 hPa (28.91 inHg)	None	None	None	
Jerry	October 12 – 16, 1989	85 mph (140 km/h)	982 hPa (29.00 inHg)	Texas, eastern United States	$70 million	3	
Bertha	July 24 – August 2, 1990	80 mph (130 km/h)	973 hPa (28.73 inHg)	The Bahamas, United States East Coast, Bermuda, Atlantic Canada	$3.91 million	9	
Josephine	September 21 – October 6, 1990	85 mph (140 km/h)	980 hPa (28.94 inHg)	None	None	None	
Klaus	October 3 – 9, 1990	80 mph (130 km/h)	985 hPa (29.09 inHg)	Lesser Antilles, Puerto Rico, Hispaniola, Turks and Caicos Islands, The Bahamas, Southeastern United States	$1 million	11	
Lili	October 6 – 14, 1990	75 mph (120 km/h)	987 hPa (29.15 inHg)	Bermuda, United States East Coast, Atlantic Canada	None	None	
Nana	October 16 – 21, 1990	85 mph (140 km/h)	989 hPa (29.21 inHg)	Bermuda	Moderate	None	
1991 Perfect Storm	October 31 - November 2, 1991	75 mph (120 km/h)	980 hPa (28.94 inHg)	Northeastern United States, Mid-Atlantic states, Eastern Canada	$200 million	13	
Frances	October 23 – 27, 1992	85 mph (140 km/h)	976 hPa (28.82 inHg)	Newfoundland, Iberian Peninsula	None	None	
Floyd	September 7 – 10, 1993	75 mph (120 km/h)	990 hPa (29.23 inHg)	Newfoundland	None	None	
Harvey	September 18 – 21, 1993	75 mph (120 km/h)	990 hPa (29.23 inHg)	None	None	None	
Chris	August 16 – 23, 1994	80 mph (130 km/h)	979 hPa (28.91 inHg)	Bermuda	None	None	
Gordon	November 8 – 21, 1994	85 mph (140 km/h)	980 hPa (28.94 inHg)	Central America, Cayman Islands, Jamaica, Hispaniola, Cuba, Turks and Caicos Islands, The Bahamas, Florida, Georgia, Mid-Atlantic states	$594 million	1,152	
Allison	June 3 – 6, 1995	75 mph (120 km/h)	987 hPa (29.15 inHg)	Yucatán Peninsula, western Cuba, Florida, Georgia, The Carolinas, Atlantic Canada	$1.7 million	1	
Noel	September 28 – October 7, 1995	75 mph (120 km/h)	987 hPa (29.15 inHg)	None	None	None	
Tanya	October 26 – November 1, 1995	85 mph (140 km/h)	972 hPa (28.70 inHg)	Azores	Minimal	1	
Cesar	July 24 – 28, 1996	85 mph (140 km/h)	985 hPa (29.09 inHg)	Windward Islands, Trinidad and Tobago, Leeward Antilles, Venezuela, Colombia, Mexico, Socorro Island, Panama, Guatemala, El Salvador	$203 million	113	
Dolly	August 19 – 25, 1996	80 mph (130 km/h)	989 hPa (29.21 inHg)	Belize, Mexico, Texas	Unknown	14	
Marco	November 16 – 26, 1996	75 mph (120 km/h)	983 hPa (29.03 inHg)	Cuba, Hispaniola, Central America, Jamaica, Florida	$8.2 million	15	
Bill	July 11 – 13, 1997	75 mph (120 km/h)	986 hPa (29.12 inHg)	Newfoundland	None	None	
Danny	July 16 – 26, 1997	80 mph (130 km/h)	984 hPa (29.06 inHg)	Louisiana, Alabama, Southeastern United States, Mid-Atlantic states, New England	$100 million	9	
Ivan	September 19 – 27, 1998	90 mph (150 km/h)	975 hPa (28.79 inHg)	None	None	None	
Lisa	October 5 – 9, 1998	75 mph (120 km/h)	995 hPa (29.38 inHg)	None	None	None	
Nicole	November 24 – December 1, 1998	85 mph (140 km/h)	979 hPa (28.91 inHg)	None	None	None	
Debby	August 19 – 24, 2000	85 mph (140 km/h)	991 hPa (29.26 inHg)	Lesser Antilles, Puerto Rico, Hispaniola, Turks and Caicos Islands, Cuba, Jamaica	$735 thousand	1	
Florence	September 10 – 19, 2000	80 mph (130 km/h)	985 hPa (29.09 inHg)	United States East Coast, Bermuda, Atlantic Canada	None	3	
Gordon	September 14 – 21, 2000	80 mph (130 km/h)	981 hPa (28.97 inHg)	Belize, Yucatán Peninsula, Cuba, United States East Coast, Atlantic Canada	$10.8 million	26	
Joyce	September 29 – October 2, 2000	90 mph (150 km/h)	975 hPa (28.79 inHg)	Trinidad and Tobago, Windward Islands, Leeward Islands	Minimal	None	
Gabrielle	September 11 – 19, 2001	80 mph (130 km/h)	975 hPa (28.79 inHg)	Florida, Newfoundland	> 230 million	3	
Karen	October 12 – 15, 2001	80 mph (130 km/h)	982 hPa (29.00 inHg)	Bermuda, Atlantic Canada	$1.4 million	None	
Noel	November 4 – 6, 2001	75 mph (120 km/h)	986 hPa (29.12 inHg)	Atlantic Canada	Minimal	None	
Olga	November 24 – December 7, 2001	90 mph (150 km/h)	973 hPa (28.73 inHg)	Bermuda, The Bahamas, Cuba, Florida	Minimal	None	
Kyle	September 20 – October 14, 2002	85 mph (140 km/h)	980 hPa (28.94 inHg)	Bermuda, Florida, Georgia, The Carolinas, British Isles	$5 million	1	
Claudette	July 8 – 17, 2003	90 mph (150 km/h)	979 hPa (28.91 inHg)	Windward Islands, Jamaica, Yucatán Peninsula, Northern Mexico, Texas	$181 million	3	
Danny	July 16 – 21, 2003	75 mph (120 km/h)	1,000 hPa (29.53 inHg)	None	None	None	
Erika	August 14 – 17, 2003	75 mph (120 km/h)	986 hPa (29.12 inHg)	Florida, Mexico, Southern Texas	$100 thousand	2	
Gaston	August 27 – September 3, 2004	75 mph (120 km/h)	985 hPa (29.09 inHg)	The Carolinas, Virginia, Maryland, Delaware, Massachusetts	$130 million	9	
Lisa	September 19 – October 3, 2004	75 mph (120 km/h)	987 hPa (29.15 inHg)	None	None	None	
Cindy	July 3 – 12, 2005	75 mph (120 km/h)	991 hPa (29.26 inHg)	Yucatán Peninsula, The Carolinas, Alabama, Mississippi, Louisiana	$320 million	3	
Nate	September 5 – 13, 2005	90 mph (150 km/h)	976 hPa (28.82 inHg)	Bermuda, United States East Coast, Scotland, Norway	Minimal	2	
Ophelia	September 6 – 23, 2005	85 mph (140 km/h)	976 hPa (28.82 inHg)	The Bahamas, Eastern Coast of the United States, Atlantic Canada, Europe	$70 million	3	
Philippe	September 17 – 23, 2005	80 mph (130 km/h)	985 hPa (29.09 inHg)	Bermuda	Minimal	None	
Stan	October 1 – 5, 2005	80 mph (130 km/h)	977 hPa (28.85 inHg)	Costa Rica, Nicaragua, Honduras, El Salvador, Belize, Guatemala, Mexico	$3.96 billion	1,668	
Vince	October 8 – 11, 2005	75 mph (120 km/h)	988 hPa (29.18 inHg)	Madeira Islands, Southern Portugal, Southwestern Spain	Minimal	None	
Epsilon	November 29 – December 10, 2005	85 mph (140 km/h)	981 hPa (28.97 inHg)	None	Minimal	None	
Ernesto	August 24 – September 1, 2006	75 mph (120 km/h)	985 hPa (29.09 inHg)	Lesser Antilles, Puerto Rico, Hispaniola, Cuba, United States East Coast, Atlantic Canada	$500 million	11	
Florence	September 3 – 18, 2006	90 mph (150 km/h)	974 hPa (28.76 inHg)	Bermuda, Newfoundland, United States East Coast, Atlantic Canada, Iceland, Greenland	$200 thousand	None	
Isaac	September 27 – October 2, 2006	85 mph (140 km/h)	985 hPa (29.09 inHg)	Newfoundland	Minimal	None	
Humberto	September 12 – 14, 2007	90 mph (150 km/h)	985 hPa (29.09 inHg)	Texas, Louisiana, Mississippi, The Carolinas	$50 million	1	
Karen	September 25 – 29, 2007	75 mph (120 km/h)	988 hPa (29.18 inHg)	None	Minimal	None	
Lorenzo	September 25 – 28, 2007	80 mph (130 km/h)	990 hPa (29.23 inHg)	Central Mexico	$92 million	6	
Noel	October 28 – November 7, 2007	80 mph (130 km/h)	980 hPa (28.94 inHg)	The Caribbean, The Bahamas, Florida, Eastern United States, Eastern Canada, Greenland, Western Europe	$580 million	222	
Hanna	August 28 – September 12, 2008	85 mph (140 km/h)	977 hPa (28.85 inHg)	Puerto Rico, Turks and Caicos Islands, The Bahamas, Hispaniola, United States East Coast, Atlantic Canada	$160 million	537	
Kyle	September 25 – 30, 2008	85 mph (140 km/h)	984 hPa (29.06 inHg)	Puerto Rico, Hispaniola, Bermuda, New England, Atlantic Canada	$57.1 million	8	

=== 2010–present ===
Name	Duration	Peak intensity		Areas affected	Damage (USD)	Deaths	Refs
Name	Duration	Wind speed	Pressure	Areas affected	Damage (USD)	Deaths	Refs
Lisa	September 20 – 26, 2010	85 mph (140 km/h)	982 hPa (29.00 inHg)	None	None	None	
Otto	October 6 – 18, 2010	85 mph (140 km/h)	976 hPa (28.82 inHg)	Leeward Islands, Virgin Islands, Puerto Rico	≥ $22.5 million	None	
Shary	October 28 – 31, 2010	75 mph (120 km/h)	989 hPa (29.21 inHg)	None	None	None	
Maria	September 5 – September 18, 2011	80 mph (130 km/h)	983 hPa (29.03 inHg)	Lesser Antilles, Bermuda, Newfoundland, Europe	≥ $1.3 million	None	
Nate	September 7 – 12, 2011	75 mph (120 km/h)	994 hPa (29.35 inHg)	Mexico	Minimal	5	
Philippe	September 24 – October 8, 2011	90 mph (150 km/h)	976 hPa (28.82 inHg)	None	Minimal	None	
Chris	June 18 – 22, 2012	85 mph (140 km/h)	974 hPa (28.76 inHg)	Bermuda, Atlantic Canada	Minimal	None	
Isaac	August 21 – September 3, 2012	80 mph (130 km/h)	965 hPa (28.50 inHg)	The Caribbean, The Bahamas, Southeastern United States, Midwestern United States	≥$3.11 billion	41	
Leslie	August 30 – September 12, 2012	80 mph (130 km/h)	968 hPa (28.59 inHg)	Leeward Islands, Bermuda, Atlantic Canada	$10.1 million	None	
Nadine	September 10 – October 4, 2012	90 mph (150 km/h)	978 hPa (28.88 inHg)	Mexico, Texas	Minimal	None	
Humberto	September 8 – 19, 2013	90 mph (150 km/h)	979 hPa (28.91 inHg)	Cape Verde	Minimal	None	
Ingrid	September 12 – 17, 2013	85 mph (140 km/h)	983 hPa (29.03 inHg)	Mexico, Texas	≥ $1.5 billion	32	
Bertha	August 1 – 16, 2014	80 mph (130 km/h)	998 hPa (29.47 inHg)	The Caribbean, Cuba, Turks and Caicos Islands, The Bahamas, United States East Coast, Western Europe	≥ $3.8 million	4	
Cristobal	August 23 – September 2, 2014	85 mph (140 km/h)	965 hPa (28.50 inHg)	Puerto Rico, Hispaniola, Turks and Caicos Islands, United States East Coast, Bermuda, Iceland	Unknown	7	
Fay	October 10 – 13, 2014	80 mph (130 km/h)	983 hPa (29.03 inHg)	Bermuda	≥ $3.8 million	None	
Fred	August 30 – September 6, 2015	85 mph (140 km/h)	986 hPa (29.12 inHg)	West Africa, Cape Verde	$2.5 million	9	
Kate	November 8 – 11, 2015	85 mph (140 km/h)	980 hPa (28.94 inHg)	Martinique, Puerto Rico, Hispaniola, The Bahamas, Europe	Minimal	None	
Alex	January 12 – 15, 2016	85 mph (140 km/h)	981 hPa (28.97 inHg)	Azores	Minimal	1	
Earl	August 2 – 6, 2016	85 mph (140 km/h)	979 hPa (28.91 inHg)	Greater Antilles, Central America, Mexico	$250 million	94	
Hermine	August 28 – September 3, 2016	80 mph (130 km/h)	981 hPa (28.97 inHg)	East Coast of the United States	$550 million	5	
Franklin	August 7 – 10, 2017	85 mph (140 km/h)	981 hPa (28.97 inHg)	Central America, Mexico	$15 million	0	
Nate	October 4 – 8, 2017	90 mph (150 km/h)	981 hPa (28.97 inHg)	Central America, Mexico, eastern United States	$787 million	48	
Beryl	July 4 – 15, 2018	80 mph (130 km/h)	991 hPa (29.26 inHg)	Lesser Antilles, Greater Antilles	None	None	
Isaac	September 7 – 15, 2018	75 mph (120 km/h)	995 hPa (29.38 inHg)	Lesser Antilles	Minor	None	
Leslie	September 23 – October 13, 2018	90 mph (150 km/h)	968 hPa (28.59 inHg)	Azores, Iberian Peninsula	$500 million	17	
Barry	July 11 – 15, 2019	75 mph (120 km/h)	993 hPa (29.32 inHg)	Southeastern United States	$600 million	None	
Pablo	October 25 – 28, 2019	80 mph (130 km/h)	977 hPa (28.85 inHg)	Azores	None	None	
Hanna	July 23 – 26, 2020	90 mph (150 km/h)	973 hPa (28.73 inHg)	Cuba, Hispaniola, United States Gulf Coast, Mexico	$1.2 billion	9	
Isaias	July 30 – August 4, 2020	90 mph (150 km/h)	986 hPa (29.12 inHg)	The Caribbean, The Bahamas, United States East Coast, Eastern Canada	$4.8 billion	17	
Marco	August 21 – 25, 2020	75 mph (120 km/h)	991 hPa (29.26 inHg)	Central America, Yucatán Peninsula, United States Gulf Coast	Minor	None	
Nana	September 1 – 3, 2020	75 mph (120 km/h)	994 hPa (29.35 inHg)	Honduras, Jamaica, Belize, Guatemala	Minor	None	
Gamma	October 2 – 6, 2020	75 mph (120 km/h)	978 hPa (28.88 inHg)	Honduras, Yucatán Peninsula, Cayman Islands, Cuba, Florida	Unknown	6	
Elsa	June 30 – July 9, 2021	85 mph (140 km/h)	991 hPa (29.26 inHg)	The Caribbean, South Atlantic United States, Atlantic Canada	$1.2 billion	13	
Henri	August 16 – 23, 2021	75 mph (120 km/h)	986 hPa (29.12 inHg)	Bermuda, Northeastern United States	$700 million	2	
Nicholas	September 12 – 17, 2021	75 mph (120 km/h)	988 hPa (29.18 inHg)	Mexico, Texas	$1.1 billion	4	
Danielle	September 1 – 8, 2022	90 mph (150 km/h)	972 hPa (28.70 inHg)	None	None	None	
Julia	October 7 – 9, 2022	85 mph (140 km/h)	982 hPa (29.00 inHg)	Trinidad and Tobago, Venezuela, ABC Islands, Colombia, Central America	$406 million	91	
Lisa	October 31 – November 5, 2022	90 mph (150 km/h)	985 hPa (29.09 inHg)	Windward Islands, Jamaica, Cayman Islands, Central America	$100 million	None	
Martin	November 1 – 3, 2022	85 mph (140 km/h)	965 hPa (28.50 inHg)	None	None	None	
Nicole	November 7 – 11, 2022	75 mph (120 km/h)	980 hPa (28.94 inHg)	Dominican Republic, Puerto Rico, The Bahamas, Southeastern United States	$1 billion	11	
Don	July 14 – 24, 2023	75 mph (120 km/h)	988 hPa (29.18 inHg)	None	None	None	
Margot	September 7 – 17, 2023	90 mph (150 km/h)	969 hPa (28.61 inHg)	None	None	None	
Debby	August 3 – 9, 2024	80 mph (130 km/h)	979 hPa (28.91 inHg)	Greater Antilles, Lucayan Archipelago, Southeastern United States, Quebec, Atlantic Canada	$4.5 billion	18	
Oscar	October 19 – 22, 2024	85 mph (140 km/h)	984 hPa (29.06 inHg)	Turks and Caicos Islands, Southern Bahamas, Eastern Cuba	$50 million	8	
Imelda	September 27 – October 2, 2025	90 mph (150 km/h)	966 hPa (28.53 inHg)	Leeward Islands, Greater Antilles, Lucayan Archipelago, East Coast of the United States, Bermuda	>$10 million	3	

=== Other systems ===
In 1996, the Lake Huron cyclone formed over the Great Lakes, and became a Category 1 equivalent subtropical cyclone at its peak.

==== Michael Chenoweth ====
A climate researcher: Michael Chenoweth has suggested that the following systems were Category 1 hurricane's on the Saffir-Simpson hurricane wind scale:

Name	Duration	Peak intensity		Areas affected	Damage (USD)	Deaths	Refs
Name	Duration	Wind speed	Pressure	Areas affected	Damage (USD)	Deaths	Refs
Unnamed	June 29 – July 4, 1851	90 mph (150 km/h)	Not Specified	Mexico	Unknown	Unknown	
Unnamed	September 26 – October 5, 1852	75 mph (120 km/h)	Not Specified	None	None	None	
Unnamed	August 15 – 22, 1853	90 mph (150 km/h)	Not Specified	Mexico	Unknown	Unknown	
Unnamed	September 2 – 5, 1853	90 mph (150 km/h)	982 hPa (29.00 inHg)	None	None	None	
Unnamed	September 24 – 29, 1853	75 mph (120 km/h)	Not Specified	None	None	None	
Unnamed	July 25 – 28, 1854	90 mph (150 km/h)	Not Specified	Texas, Mexico	Unknown	Unknown	
Unnamed	September 10 – 14, 1854	75 mph (120 km/h)	Not Specified	Mid Atlantic United States	Unknown	Unknown	
Unnamed	September 15 – 25, 1854	80 mph (130 km/h)	Not Specified	None	None	None	

== Climatology ==
Category 1 hurricanes by month
Month	Number of storms
January	2
February	0
March	0
April	0
May	4
June	21
July	41
August	88
September	147
October	85
November	32
December	8

== Landfalls ==
Name	Year	Category 1	Tropical storm	Tropical depression	Refs
Abby	1968	—	Florida (2x)	—	
Brenda	1968	—	—	Florida	
Dolly	1968	—	—	Florida	
Gladys	1968	Florida	—	—	
Martha	1969	—	Panama	—	
Alma	1970	—	—	Cuba, Florida	
Beth	1971	Nova Scotia	—	—	
Fern	1971	Texas	—	Louisiana	
Irene	1971	Nicaragua	—	—	
Agnes	1972	Florida	New York	—	
Dawn	1972	—	—	Florida	
Alice	1973	—	Nova Scotia, Newfoundland	—	
Brenda	1973	—	Yucatan Peninsula, Campeche	—	
Blanche	1975	Nova Scotia	—	—	
Babe	1977	Louisiana	—	—	
Cora	1978	—	Grenada	—	
Bob	1979	Louisiana	—	—	
Dennis	1981	—	Cuba, Florida	—	
Katrina	1981	Cuba	—	—	
Barry	1983	Northern Mexico	—	Florida	
Klaus	1984	—	Puerto Rico	—	
Bob	1985	South Carolina	Florida	—	
Danny	1985	Louisiana	—	—	
Juan	1985	Louisiana	Florida	—	
Bonnie	1986	Texas	—	—	
Charley	1986	North Carolina	—	—	
Debby	1988	Mexico	—	—	
Florence	1988	—	Louisiana	—	
Chantal	1989	Texas	—	—	
Jerry	1989	Texas	—	—	
"Perfect Storm"	1991	—	Nova Scotia	Prince Edward Island	
Gordon	1994	—	Jamaica, Cuba, Florida (2x)	Florida	
Allison	1995	—	Florida	—	
Cesar	1996	Nicaragua	Colombia	—	
Dolly	1996	Quintana Roo and Tamaulipas	—	—	
Danny	1997	Louisiana and Alabama	—	—	
Debby	2000	Barbuda, Saint Barthélemy and Virgin Gorda	—	—	
Gordon	2000	—	Florida	Quintana Roo	
Gabrielle	2001	—	Florida	—	
Karen	2001	—	Nova Scotia	—	
Kyle	2002	—	South Carolina and North Carolina	—	
Claudette	2003	Texas	Quintana Roo	—	
Erika	2003	Tamaulipas	—	—	
Gaston	2004	South Carolina	—	—	
Cindy	2005	Louisiana	Mississippi	—	
Stan	2005	Veracruz	Quintana Roo	—	
Vince	2005	—	—	Spain	
Ernesto	2006	—	Cuba, Florida and North Carolina	—	
Humberto	2007	Texas	—	—	
Lorenzo	2007	Veracruz	—	—	
Noel	2007	—	Haiti, Cuba and New Providence	—	
Hanna	2008	—	Middle Caicos Island, South Carolina-North Carolina border, New York and Connecticut	—	
Kyle	2008	Nova Scotia	—	—	
Maria	2011	—	Newfoundland	—	
Nate	2011	—	Veracruz	—	
Isaac	2012	Louisiana	Haiti, Cuba	—	
Ingrid	2013	—	Tamaulipas	—	
Bertha	2014	—	Turks and Caicos Islands	—	
Fay	2014	Bermuda	—	—	
Alex	2016	—	Azores	—	
Earl	2016	Belize	Veracruz	—	
Hermine	2016	Florida	—	—	
Franklin	2017	Veracruz	Quintana Roo	—	
Nate	2017	Louisiana and Mississippi	Nicaragua	—	
Barry	2019	Louisiana	—	—	
Hanna	2020	Texas	—	—	
Isaias	2020	Andros Island and North Carolina	Dominican Republic	—	
Nana	2020	Belize	—	—	
Gamma	2020	Quintana Roo	—	Yucatán	
Elsa	2021	—	Cuba, Florida, New York and Rhode Island	—	
Henri	2021	—	Rhode Island	—	
Nicholas	2021	Texas	—	—	
Julia	2022	Nicaragua	—	Venezuela, Colombia	
Lisa	2022	Belize	—	—	
Nicole	2022	Grand Bahama and Florida	Great Abaco Island	—	
Debby	2024	Florida	South Carolina	Cuba	
Oscar	2024	Great Inagua and Cuba	—	—	
Imelda	2025	—	Abaco Islands	—	

== See also ==
- List of Category 1 Pacific hurricanes
- List of Category 1 South Pacific tropical cyclones
- List of Category 1 Australian region tropical cyclones
- List of Category 2 Atlantic hurricanes
- List of Category 3 Atlantic hurricanes
- List of Category 4 Atlantic hurricanes
- List of Category 5 Atlantic hurricanes
- Lists of Atlantic hurricanes
