= 1854 Atlantic hurricane season =

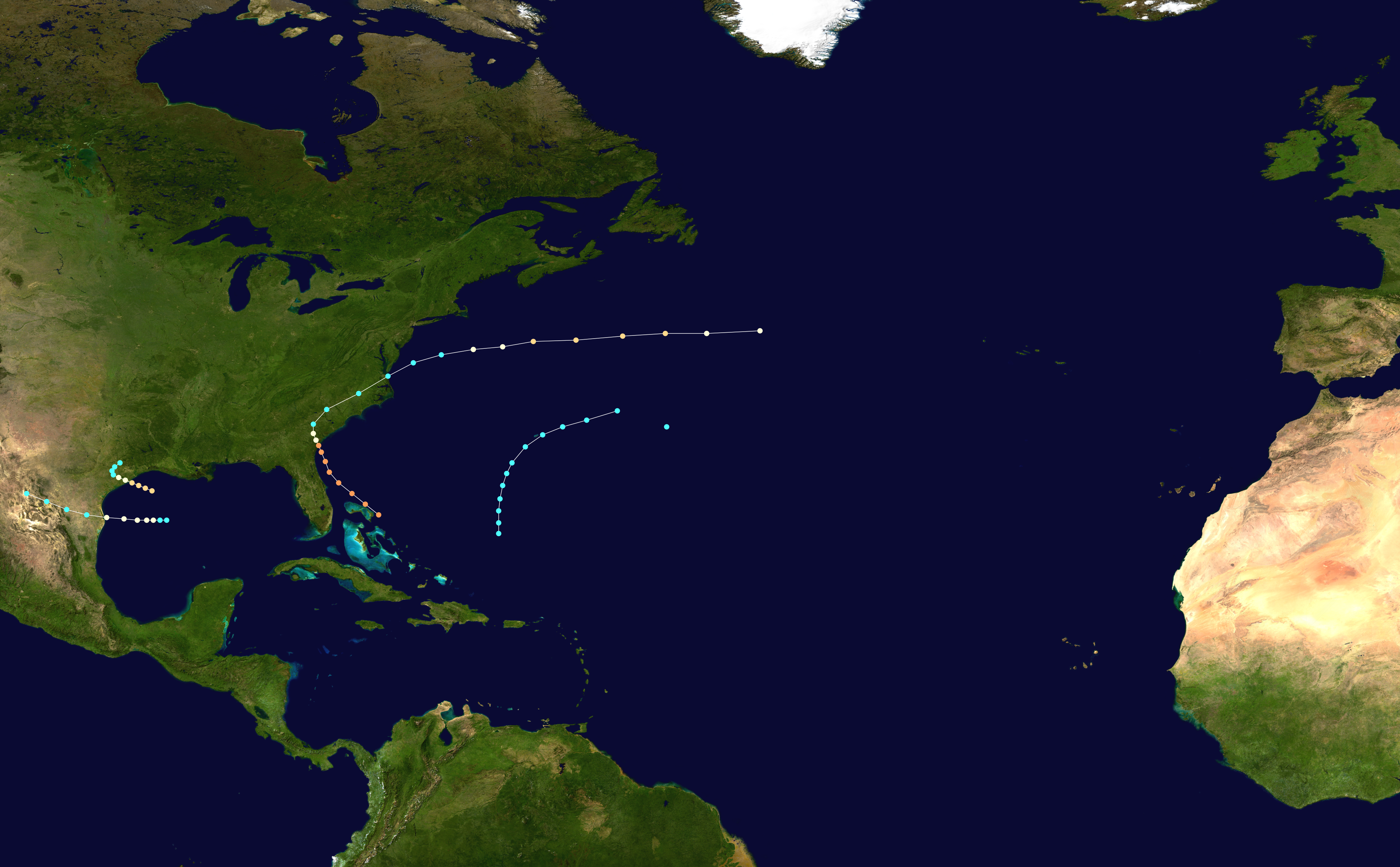
- Season summary map

Seasonal boundaries
- First system formed: June 25, 1854
- Last system dissipated: October 22, 1854

Strongest storm
- Name: Three
  - Maximum winds: 125 mph (205 km/h) (1-minute sustained)
  - Lowest pressure: 938 mbar (hPa; 27.7 inHg)

Seasonal statistics
- Total storms: 5
- Hurricanes: 3
- Major hurricanes (Cat. 3+): 1
- Total fatalities: 30+ direct
- Total damage: $20,000 (1854 USD)

The 1854 Atlantic hurricane season featured five known tropical cyclones, three of which made landfall in the United States. At one time, another was believed to have existed near Galveston, Texas, in September. However, HURDAT – the official Atlantic hurricane database – now excludes this system. The first system, Hurricane One, was initially observed on June 25. The final storm, Hurricane Five, was last observed on October 22. These dates fall within the period with the most tropical cyclone activity in the Atlantic. No tropical cyclones during this season existed simultaneously. One tropical cyclone has a single known point in its track due to a sparsity of data.

Of the season's five tropical cyclones, three reached hurricane status. Furthermore, one of those strengthened into a major hurricane, which is Category 3 or higher on the modern-day Saffir–Simpson hurricane wind scale. The strongest cyclone of the season, the third hurricane, peaked at Category 3 strength with 125 mph (201 km/h) winds. After making landfall near the Georgia–South Carolina border, the storm caused 26 fatalities and extensive damage in the area. Hurricane Four caused four deaths and approximately $20,000 (1854 USD) in damage after striking the coast of Texas. Hurricane One also caused moderate damage in Texas.

== Systems ==
=== Hurricane One ===
- Category 1 hurricane (SSHWS)
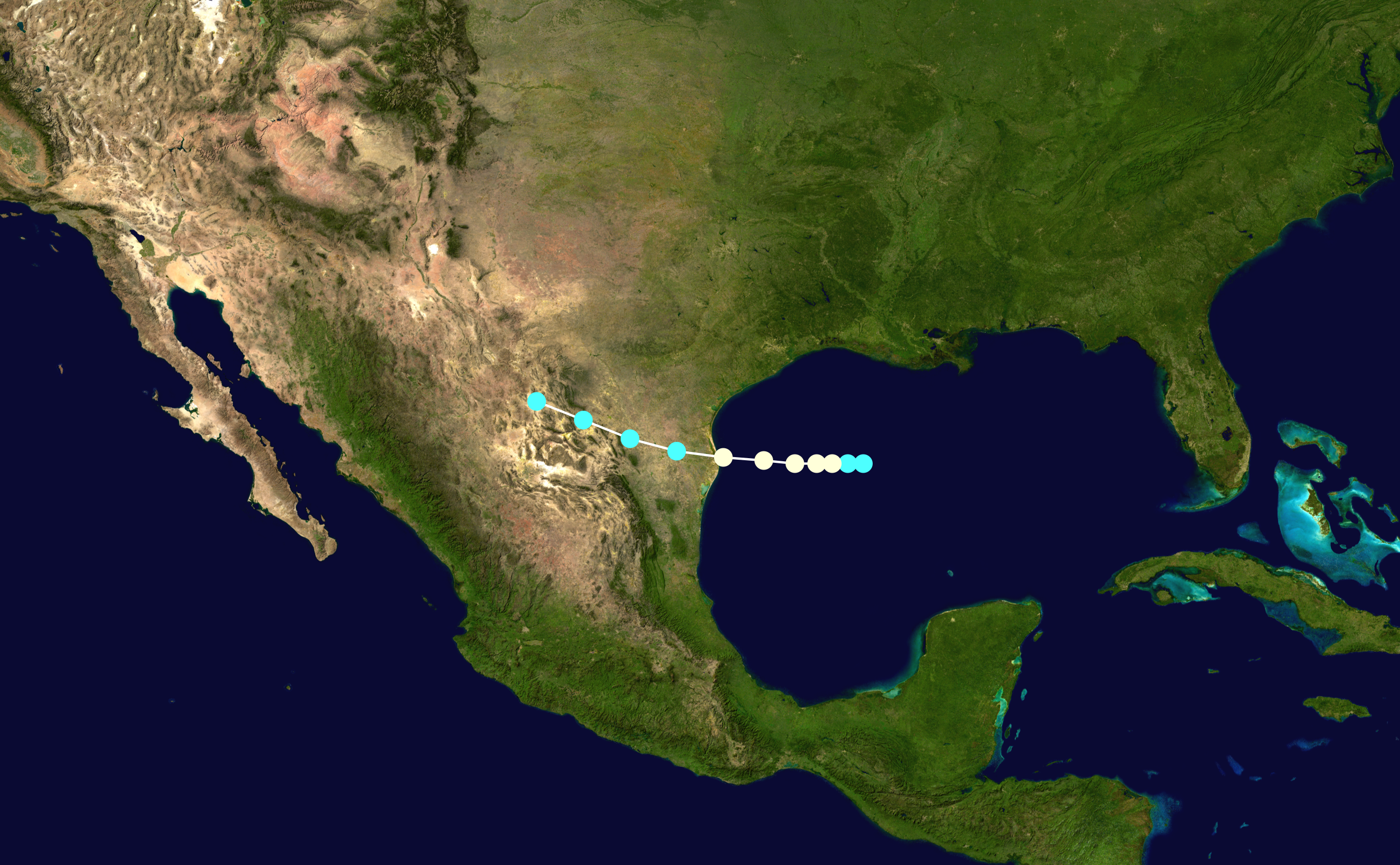
- Duration: June 25 – June 27
- Peak intensity: 80 mph (130 km/h) (1-min); 982 mbar (hPa)

A tropical storm was first observed in the Gulf of Mexico on June 25, while located about 240 mi (385 km) south-southwest of Marsh Island, Louisiana. It headed westward and strengthened into a hurricane about 12 hours later. Peaking with maximum sustained winds 80 mph (130 km/h) and a minimum barometric pressure of 982 mbar (29.0 inHg), the storm maintained this intensity until making landfall in South Padre Island, Texas, at 1200 UTC on June 26. It quickly weakened inland and fell to tropical storm strength about six hours later. The system continued in a west-northwestward direction over northern Mexico, until dissipating in a rural area of Coahuila on June 27.

This system brought near tropical storm-force winds to Texas as far north as Galveston. Brazos Island experienced the brunt of this storm, where winds blew a "perfect hurricane". Many buildings in the area lost their roofs or were moved by the winds. Additionally, a cistern at the Quartermaster's Department was destroyed. The coast of Texas was also impacted by storm surge, with several bath houses washed away at Lavaca. Precipitation in the region was generally light, peaking at 6.63 in (168 mm) at Fort Ringgold, which is near modern-day Rio Grande City. As of 2024, it is one of only 20 hurricanes to make a landfall in the Contiguous United States during the month of June. (Note: Winds greater than 73 mph (117 km/h), which corresponds to Category 1 or higher on the Saffir-Simpson Scale, is considered to be of "hurricane intensity.")

=== Tropical Storm Two ===
- Tropical storm (SSHWS)
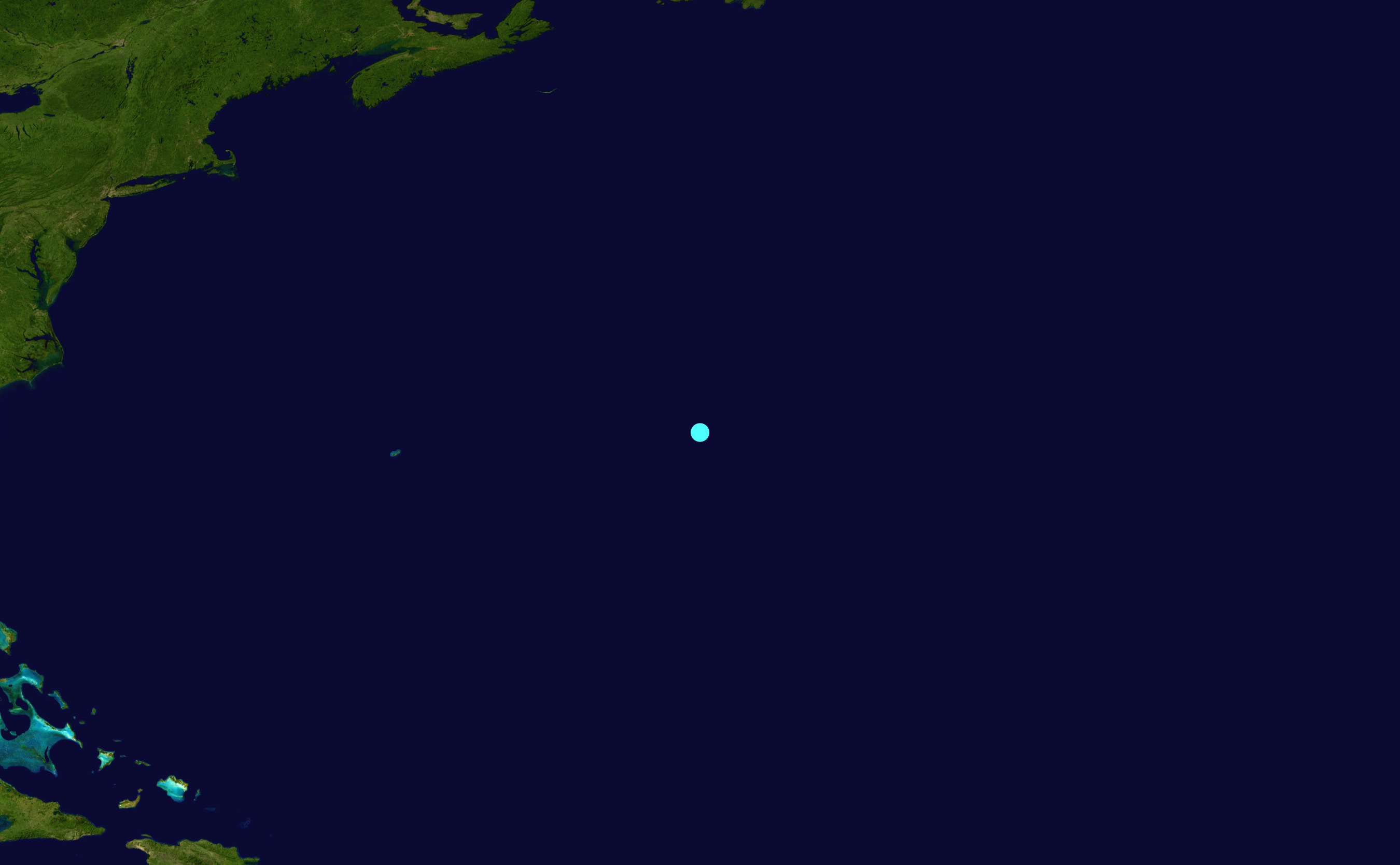
- Duration: August 23 – August 23
- Peak intensity: 70 mph (110 km/h) (1-min);

The ships Highflyer and Osceola encountered a "very violent" gale on August 23, while located at 33.0°N, 55.0°W, which is about 565 mi (910 km) east-northeast of Bermuda. A sustained wind speed of 70 mph (110 km/h) was recorded, indicative of a strong tropical storm. No further information is available of this storm. However, the barque Pilgrim experienced a severe gale on August 29, which may have been the extratropical remnants of this system.

Climate researcher Michael Chenoweth noted in a reanalysis study, published in 2014, that this system should be removed from HURDAT due to "Insufficient supporting evidence from other neighboring data sources".

=== Hurricane Three ===
- Category 3 hurricane (SSHWS)
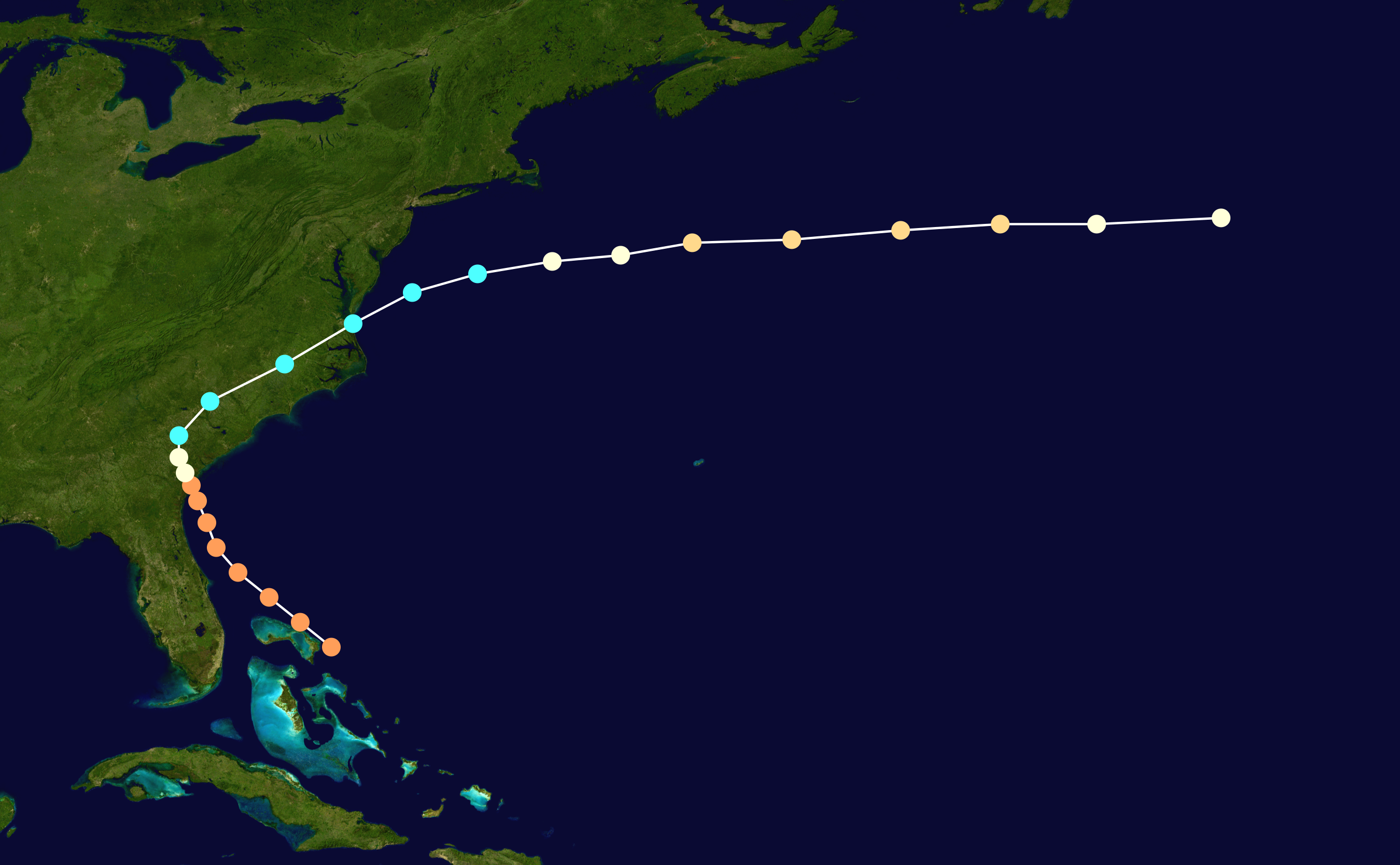
- Duration: September 7 – September 12
- Peak intensity: 125 mph (205 km/h) (1-min); 938 mbar (hPa)

The Coastal Hurricane of 1854 or The South Carolina Hurricane of 1854 closely duplicated the path of the famous 1804 Antigua–Charleston hurricane. The brig Reindeer sighted a hurricane about 25 mi (40 km) east of Hope Town in the Bahamas on September 7. With winds of 125 mph (205 km/h) and a minimum barometric pressure of 938 mbar (27.7 inHg), this was the strongest tropical cyclone of the season. It moved northwestward and weakened slightly on September 8. Later that day at 2000 UTC, the hurricane made landfall near St. Catherines Island, Georgia with winds of 115 mph (185 km/h). Early on September 9, it weakened to a Category 1 hurricane, then a tropical storm several hours later. Thereafter, the storm accelerated northeastward and re-emerged into the Atlantic Ocean near Virginia Beach, Virginia, on September 10. The system re-strengthened, becoming a hurricane again on September 11. It eventually began to weaken again while moving rapidly eastward and was last noted about 515 mi (830 km) southeast of Cape Race, Newfoundland.

Gales were reported in Florida, including as far south as St. Augustine. In Georgia, the entire coast suffered significant impacts, with damage more severe from St. Simons northward. About 110 acres (45 ha) of rice crops were destroyed, equivalent to a loss of approximately 6,000 bushels. Between Savannah, Georgia, and Charleston, South Carolina, "extraordinary tides" were reported. Hutchinson Island, Georgia, was completely submerged, while there was significant inundation in eastern Savannah. Storm surge also brought coastal flooding to much of South Carolina, from Beaufort to Georgetown. Wind damage in that area was mainly confined to downed trees. However, in Charleston, South Carolina, a two-story wooden building was destroyed and there was slight to moderate damage to other structures, limited to roofs and the destruction of fences. This hurricane compared similarly to hurricanes that struck Charleston in 1752, 1783, 1804, 1811, and 1822 in terms of flooding and strength. Throughout the United States, this storm resulted in at least 26 fatalities.

=== Hurricane Four ===
- Category 2 hurricane (SSHWS)
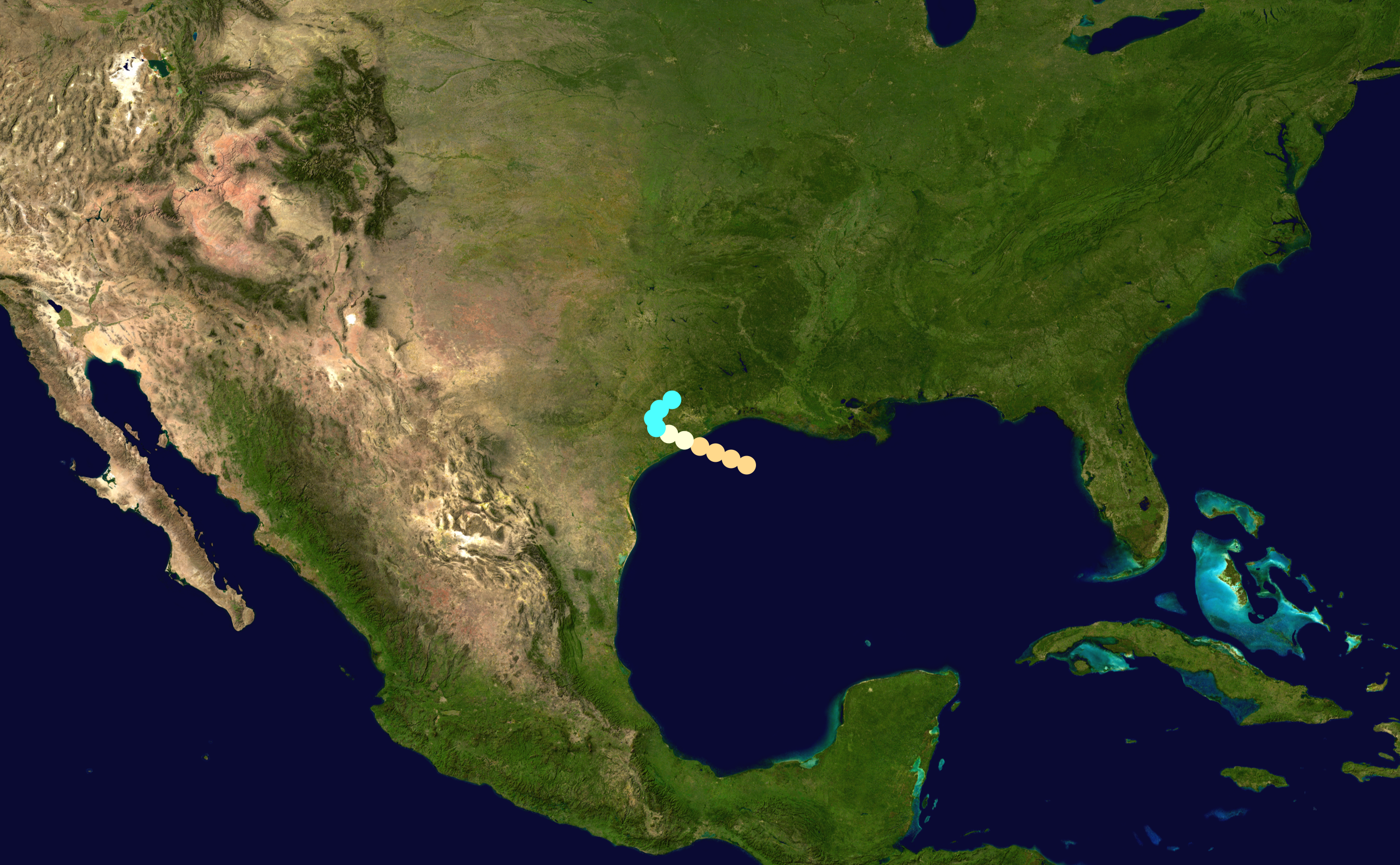
- Duration: September 18 – September 20
- Peak intensity: 105 mph (165 km/h) (1-min); 965 mbar (hPa)

The Matagorda Hurricane of 1854

Reports first indicated a hurricane in the Gulf of Mexico on September 18, while centered about 110 mi (175 km) south-southwest of Cameron, Louisiana. The storm drifted west-northwestward with winds of 105 mph (165 km/h), equivalent to a Category 2 hurricane. The lowest barometric pressure estimate was 965 mbar (28.5 inHg). At 2100 UTC on September 18, the storm made landfall near Freeport, Texas, at the same intensity. It weakened to a Category 1 hurricane early on the following day. The system further weakened to a tropical storm at 1200 UTC on September 19. Re-curving northeastward, the storm persisted until dissipating over eastern Texas on September 20.

The steamship Louisiana reported that a gale struck Matagorda, Texas, with "unparalleled fury", with nearly all buildings and vessels in the area destroyed. Several vessels also capsized near Galveston, including the Nick Hill and Kate Ward. Within the city of Galveston, merchants, businesses, and houses suffered significant water damage due to an 8 ft (2.4 m) storm surge. Cotton and sugar cane crops throughout the area were ruined. The storm caused at least four deaths, with several more occurring later due to a yellow fever outbreak. Damage in the region totaled approximately $20,000.

=== Tropical Storm Five ===
- Tropical storm (SSHWS)
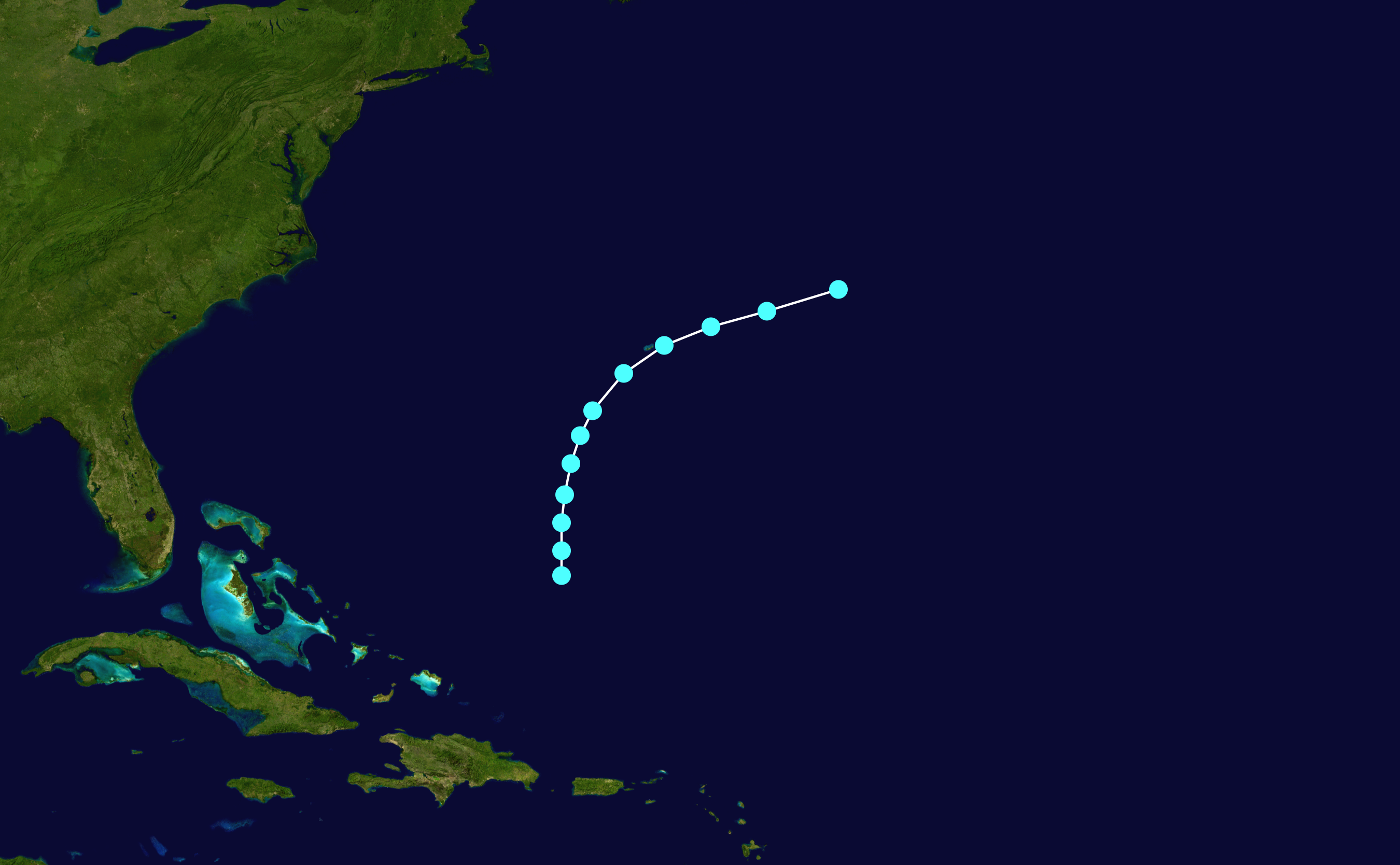
- Duration: October 20 – October 22
- Peak intensity: 70 mph (110 km/h) (1-min);

The barque Southerney observed a tropical storm on October 20, while located about 460 mi (740 km) north-northwest of San Juan, Puerto Rico. The storm strengthened slowly while heading northward, until peaking with winds of 70 mph (110 km/h) on October 21. The storm then began to re-curve northeastward. Early on October 22, it passed near Bermuda, though no impact was reported on the island. Several hours later, this system was last noted about 365 mi (585 km) east-northeast of Bermuda.

== Season effects ==
This is a table of all of the storms that formed in the 1854 Atlantic hurricane season. It includes their duration (within the basin), names, areas affected, damages, and death totals. Deaths in parentheses are additional and indirect (an example of an indirect death would be a traffic accident), but were still related to that storm. Damage and deaths include totals while the storm was extratropical, a wave, or a low, and all of the damage figures are in 1854 USD.

Saffir–Simpson scale
| TD | TS | C1 | C2 | C3 | C4 | C5 |

1854 North Atlantic tropical cyclone season statistics
| Storm name | Dates active | Storm category at peak intensity | Max 1-min wind mph (km/h) | Min. press. (mbar) | Areas affected | Damage (US$) | Deaths | Ref(s). |
|---|---|---|---|---|---|---|---|---|
| One | June 25–27 | Category 1 hurricane | 80 (130) | 982 | Texas, Mexico | Unknown | Unknown | |
| Two | August 23 | Tropical storm | 70 (110) | Unknown | None | None | None | |
| Three | September 7–12 | Category 3 hurricane | 125 (205) | 938 | Bahamas, Southeastern United States (South Carolina) | Unknown | ≥26 | |
| Four | September 18–20 | Category 2 hurricane | 105 (165) | 965 | Texas | >$20,000 | ≥4 | |
| Five | October 20–22 | Tropical storm | 70 (110) | Unknown | Bermuda | None | None | |
Season aggregates
| 5 systems | June 25 – October 22 | | 125 (205) | 938 | | >$20,000 | ≥30 | |

== See also ==
- Lists of Atlantic hurricanes
- Tropical cyclone forecasting
- HURDAT – A comprehensive record of tropical cyclone tracks since 1851.
- Atlantic reanalysis project – A project to improve historical hurricane data for past storms.
