= 1872 Atlantic hurricane season =

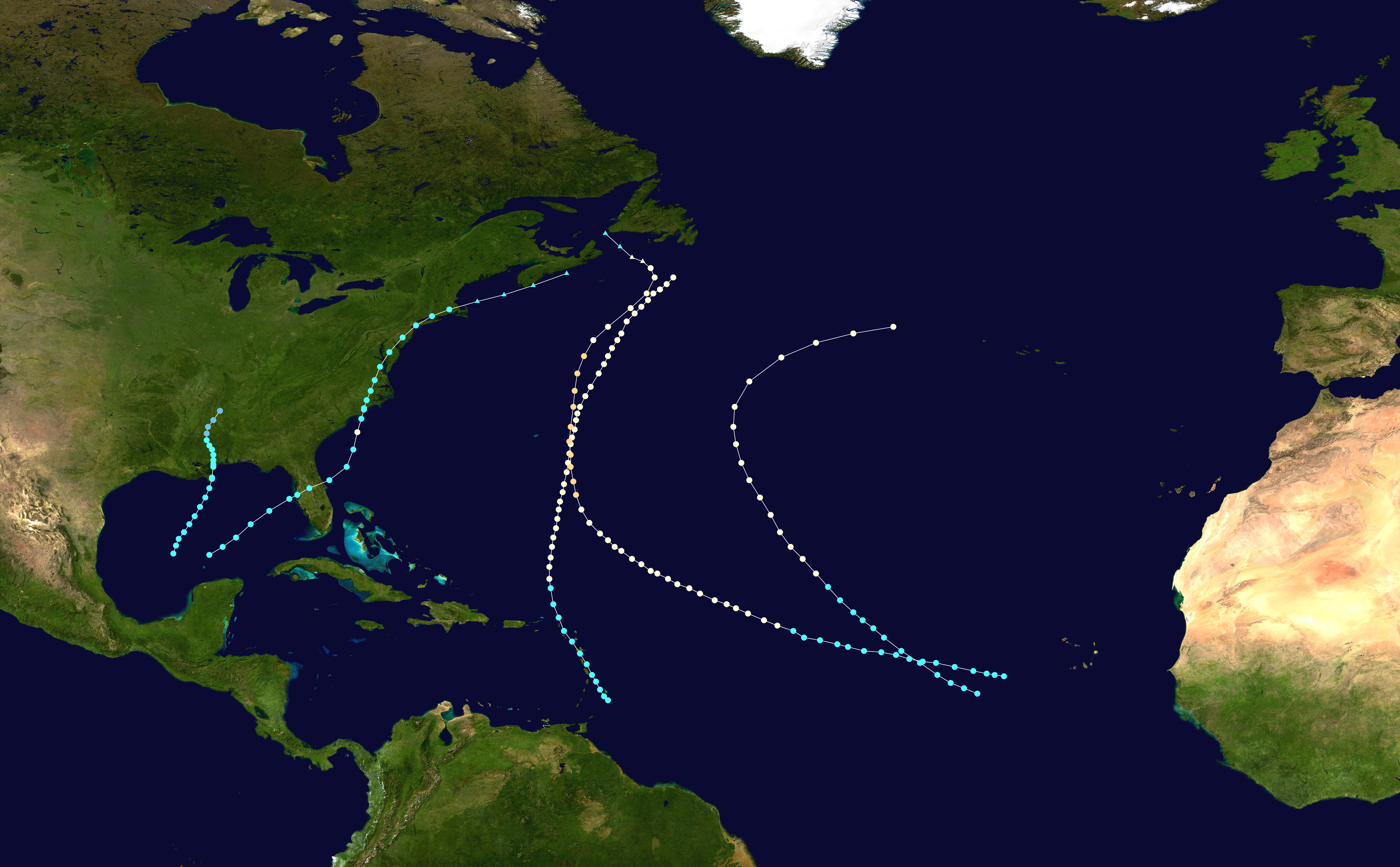
- Season summary map

Seasonal boundaries
- First system formed: July 9, 1872
- Last system dissipated: October 28, 1872

Strongest storm
- Name: Two
  - Maximum winds: 105 mph (165 km/h) (1-minute sustained)

Seasonal statistics
- Total storms: 5
- Total fatalities: 0
- Total damage: Unknown

The 1872 Atlantic hurricane season included a storm whose track became one of the first to be published by the United States Army Signal Service, a predecessor of the National Weather Service. The season was quiet, with only five documented tropical cyclones, of which four attained hurricane status. None of them intensified into a major hurricane. (Note: A major hurricane is a storm that ranks as Category 3 or higher on the Saffir–Simpson hurricane wind scale.) However, in the absence of modern satellite and other remote-sensing technologies, only storms that affected populated land areas or encountered ships at sea were recorded, so the actual total could be higher. An undercount bias of zero to six tropical cyclones per year between 1851 and 1885 has been estimated.

On July 9, the first known storm of the season was detected over the south-central Gulf of Mexico. This cyclone caused some locally severe flooding in Alabama after striking the Gulf Coast of the United States. No further activity is known to have occurred until August 20, around the time a storm formed near the Cabo Verde Islands. Of the two known cyclones originating in the month of September, one impacted several islands of the Lesser Antilles, including reportedly "many lives lost" on Dominica. The fifth and final system brought heavy rainfall and tidal flooding to portions of North Carolina and Virginia before becoming extratropical over the Gulf of Maine on October 27.

== Season summary ==
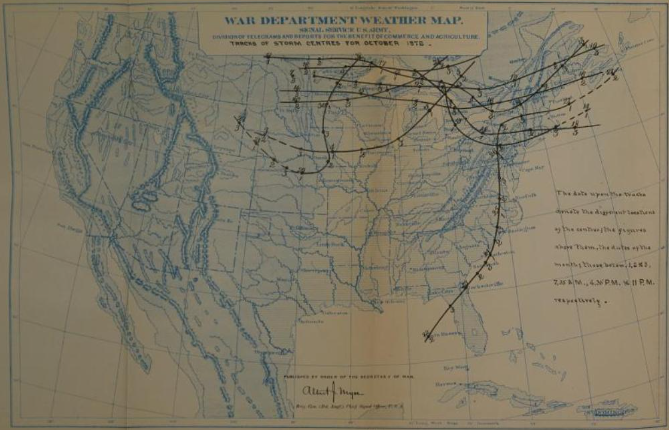
United States Army Signal Corps map of low pressure systems in October 1872, featuring the fifth tropical cyclone moving up the East Coast of the United States

The Atlantic hurricane database (HURDAT) recognizes five tropical cyclones for the 1872 season. Four storms attained hurricane status, with maximum sustained winds of 75 mph (120 km/h) or greater. None of these systems intensified into a major hurricane, which is Category 3 or higher on the modern-day Saffir–Simpson scale. However, neither the seasonal statistics nor the intensity of individual storms should be regarded as complete. Due to a lack modern satellite and other remote-sensing technologies, only storms that affected populated land areas or encountered ships at sea were recorded. Therefore, an undercount bias of zero to six tropical cyclones per year between 1851 and 1885 has been estimated.

Neither the reanalysis by José Fernández-Partagás and Henry F. Diaz in 1995 nor the Atlantic hurricane reanalysis project in 2003 added or removed any storms for the 1872 season. However, of the known 1872 cyclones, significant changes were made to the tracks of second and fourth cyclones by Fernández-Partagás and Diaz, who also proposed smaller changes to the known track of third system. Further analysis by the Atlantic hurricane reanalysis project led to a significant revision of the track for the fifth storm. Additionally, a 2014 reanalysis study by climate researcher Michael Chenoweth indicated that three new tropical cyclones formed, although these proposals have yet to be included in the official hurricane database (HURDAT).

On July 9, the first known storm of the season was initially observed over the south-central Gulf of Mexico. After striking the Gulf Coast of the United States, the cyclone caused locally severe flooding in Clarke County, Alabama, but little damage elsewhere. More than a month later, the track begins for the next system on August 20. It began the strongest storm of the season, peaking as a Category 2 hurricane with winds of 105 mph (165 km/h). Two cyclones developed in September, the first of which impacted several islands of the Lesser Antilles, with "many lives lost" on Dominica, according to a telegram to the New York Herald. The final storm of the season began as a tropical storm in the Gulf of Mexico on October 22. It crossed struck Florida and North Carolina, both at tropical storm intensity. Some areas of North Carolina and Virginia reported heavy rainfall and abnormally high tides.

The season's activity was reflected with an accumulated cyclone energy (ACE) rating of 65, less than the previous two seasons but not unusually low for the time. ACE is a metric used to express the energy used by a tropical cyclone during its lifetime. Therefore, a storm with a longer duration will have higher values of ACE. It is only calculated at six-hour increments in which specific tropical and subtropical systems are either at or above sustained wind speeds of 39 mph (63 km/h), which is the threshold for tropical storm intensity. Thus, tropical depressions are not included here.

== Systems ==
=== Tropical Storm One ===
- Tropical storm (SSHWS)
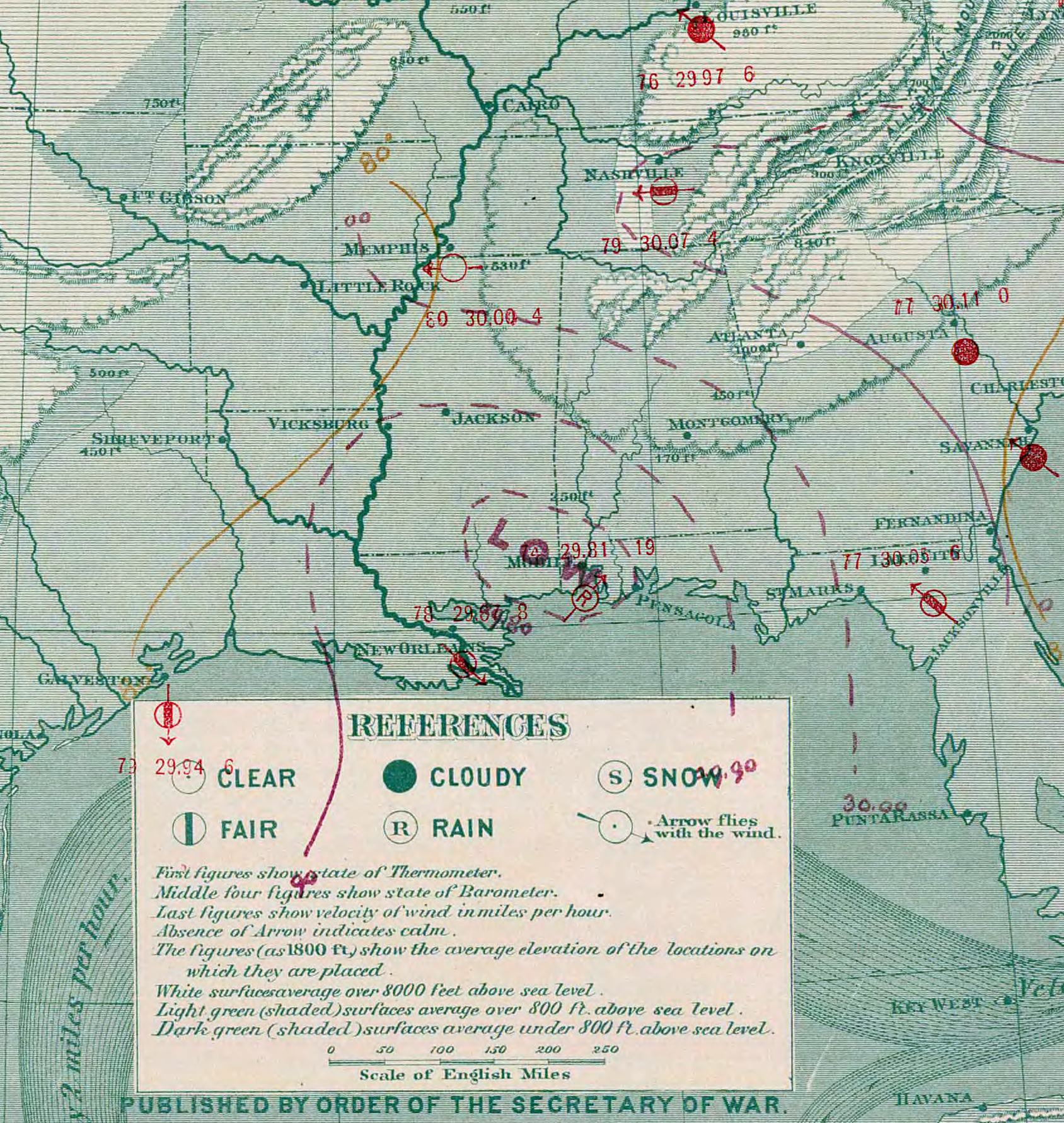
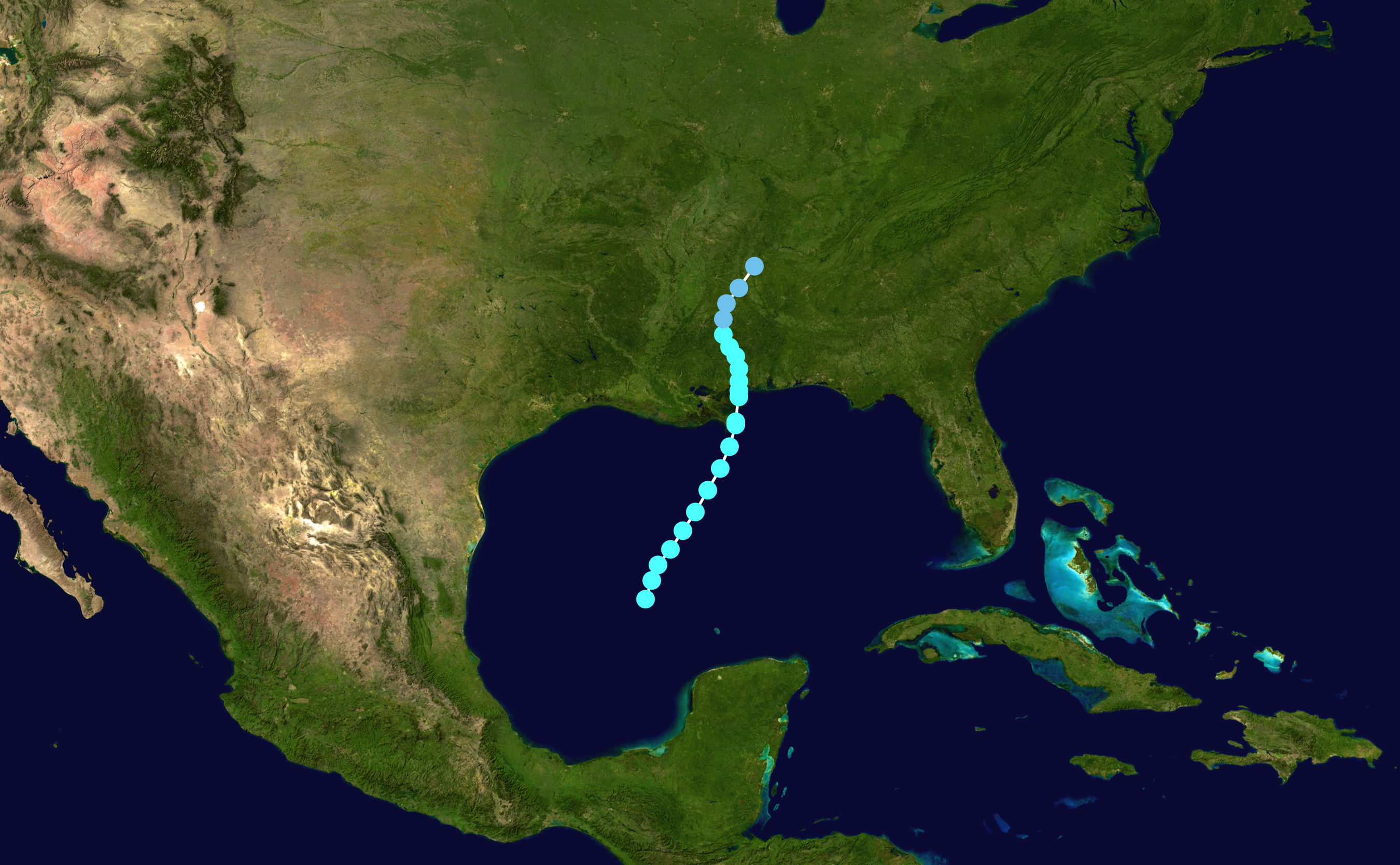
- Duration: July 9 – July 13
- Peak intensity: 60 mph (95 km/h) (1-min);

The official track for this storm begins on July 9 due to The New York Times on the following day reporting "indications of a serious disturbance in the Gulf southwest of Florida." Moving slowly northeastward across the Gulf of Mexico, the storm likely intensified only slightly, reaching winds of 60 mph (95 km/h) on July 10. The cyclone then curved northward and made two landfalls along the Gulf Coast of the United States on July 11, first in Louisiana near the mouth of the Mississippi River and a few hours later near Mississippi City. The system drifted over land and weakened to a tropical depression over central Mississippi, several hours before dissipating over the northeastern portions of the state. Climate researcher Michael Chenoweth proposed little change to this storm's intensity, track, and duration as part of a study.

In Alabama, Clarke County experienced heavy rainfall, leading to severe local crop losses, the destruction of many milldams, and the inundation of the Grand Trunk Railroad. The Clarke County Democrat newspaper reported that overall, "The damage, taken altogether, surpasses anything in the history of our county." The newspaper also noted that no reports from Mobile mentioned a storm.

=== Hurricane Two ===
- Category 2 hurricane (SSHWS)
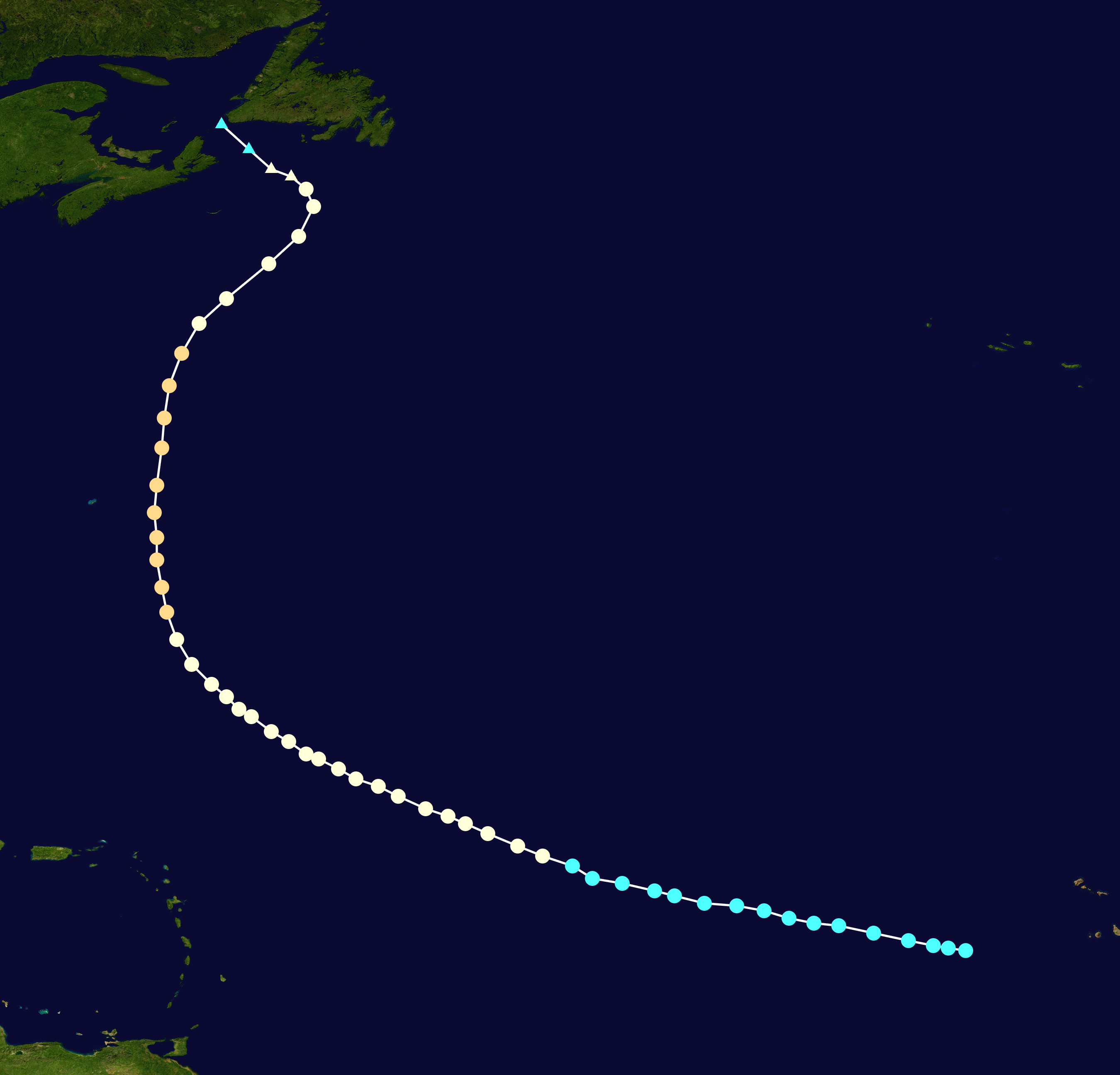
- Duration: August 20 – September 1
- Peak intensity: 105 mph (165 km/h) (1-min);

HURDAT initiates the track for this storm on August 20 as a tropical storm to the west of the southernmost Cabo Verde Islands. Trekking steadily west-northwestward, the cyclone strengthened into a hurricane on August 24 and turned north-northeastward on the following day. On August 29, it is estimated that the storm became a Category 2 hurricane on the present-day Saffir–Simpson scale and peaked with maximum sustained winds of 105 mph (165 km/h), based on observations from the ships Samplice, GanyMedes, and Ocean. The storm passed near Bermuda on August 30. By the next day, the system curved northeastward on September 1, just prior to transitioning into an extratropical cyclone near the south coast of Newfoundland. Little is known precisely about this storm before August 30, as ships did not encounter it until that date.

Chenoweth's study begins this storm on August 19 as a tropical depression. He also theorized that the cyclone reached hurricane status by August 21 and strengthened more than HURDAT suggests, peaking as a Category 4 hurricane on August 25. Near the end of the storm's duration, Chenoweth suggested it struck Newfoundland on September 2, before becoming extratropical early the next day.

=== Hurricane Three ===
- Category 1 hurricane (SSHWS)
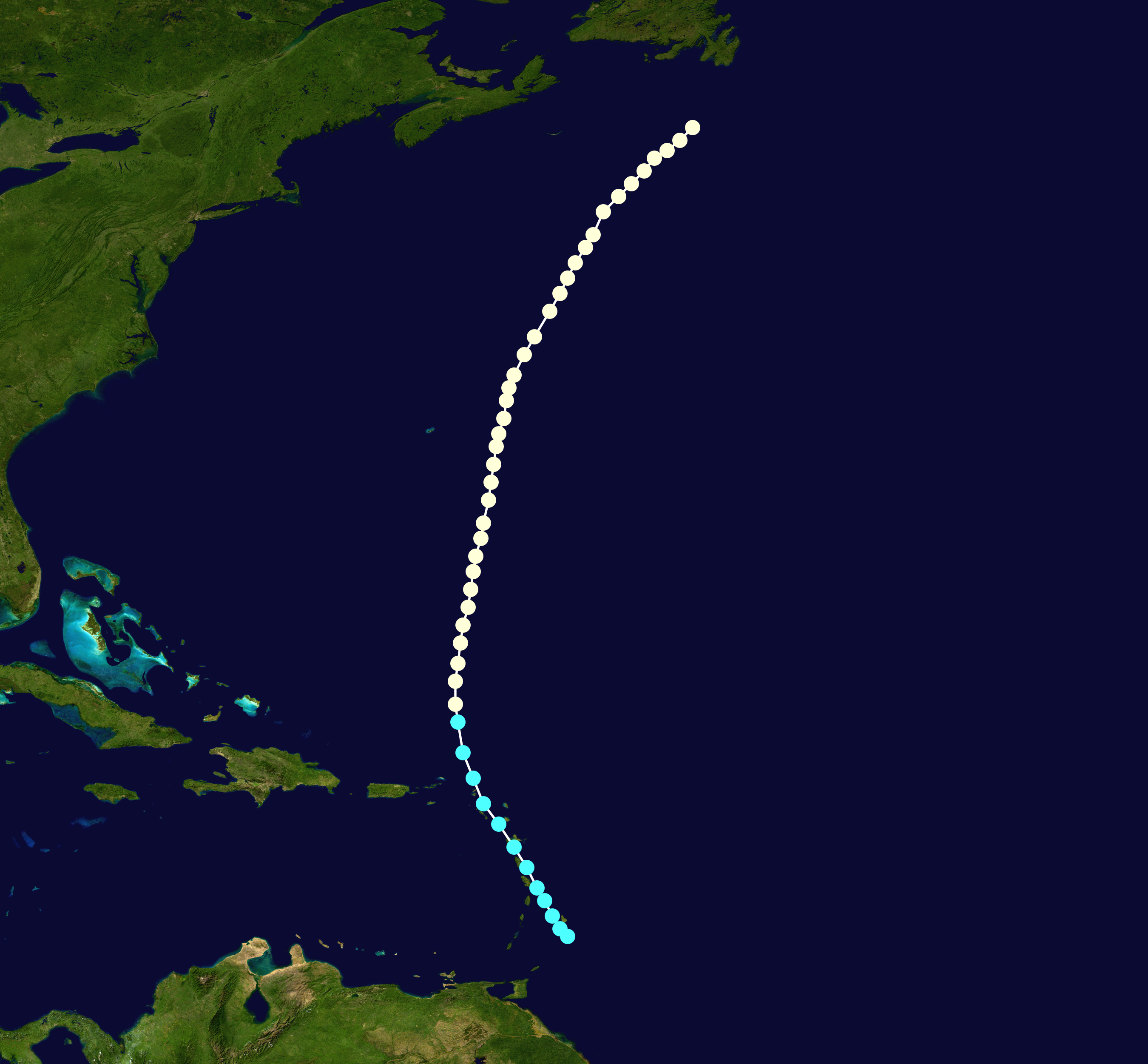
- Duration: September 9 – September 20
- Peak intensity: 80 mph (130 km/h) (1-min);

On September 9, a tropical storm was first observed just east of the Lesser Antilles. Over the following two days, it moved slowly north-northwestward through the islands, striking Guadeloupe on September 10 with winds of 60 mph (95 km/h). After moving north of the islands, the storm reached hurricane status on September 12 and is estimated to have peaked with maximum sustained winds of 80 mph (130 km/h), based on records from several ships. The cyclone then headed north-northeastward for a few days, passing well east of Bermuda on September 15. By the next day, the hurricane curved northeastward and continued near that direction until it was last observed on September 20 about 180 mi (290 km) southwest of Cape Race, Newfoundland.

Barbados, Dominica, and Saint Kitts observed sustained tropical storm-force winds, with Dominica recording sustained winds of 58 mph (93 km/h). According to a telegram received by the New York Herald, on Dominica "the vessels were dashed to pieces, wharves broken and many lives lost.", while also noting that "great damage had been done" on Guadeloupe, Martinique, and Saint Kitts. At least six vessels were lost on Martinique – the Chicken Hazard, Elora, Everard, Louisa, Maria Joseph, and Vengueur.

A study authored by Chenoweth suggests that the cyclone attained hurricane status on September 10, while it was passing through the Lesser Antilles, and that the system became an extratropical cyclone on September 20.

=== Hurricane Four ===
- Category 1 hurricane (SSHWS)
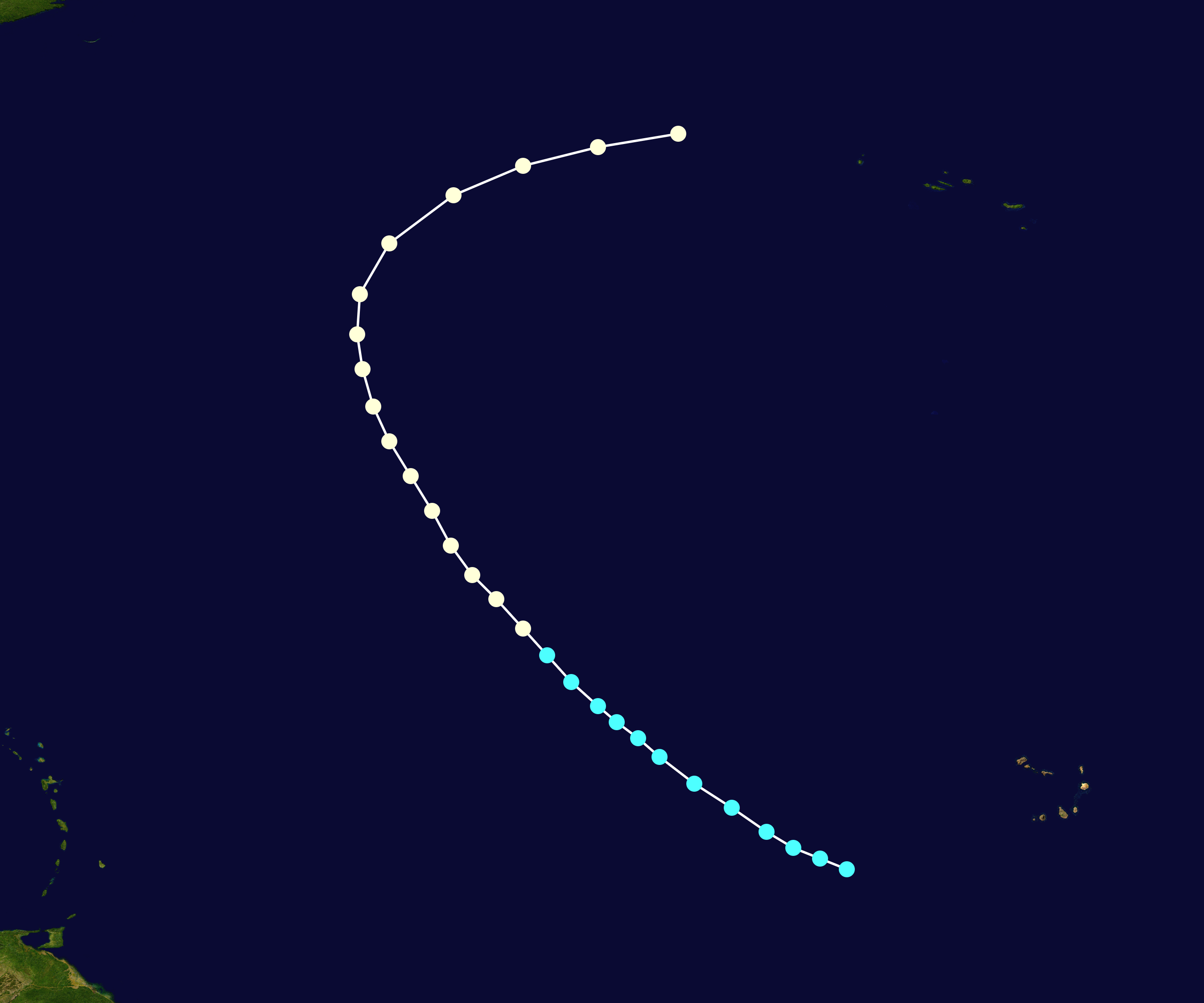
- Duration: September 30 – October 6
- Peak intensity: 80 mph (130 km/h) (1-min);

HURDAT begins the path for this system as a tropical storm to the west-southwest of the Cabo Verde Islands on September 30. Moving northwestward, the cyclone intensified into a hurricane on October 3 and peaked with sustained winds of 80 mph (130 km/h). On October 5, the system curved northeastward and then east-northeastward. A bark named Tare encountered the hurricane on October 6 to the northwest of the Azores, with the track then concluding. Little else is known about this storm due to lack of information. According to Chenoweth, this system originated as a tropical depression on September 29 and attained hurricane status by the next day. His study also suggests that the storm became an extratropical cyclone late on October 7.

=== Hurricane Five ===
- Category 1 hurricane (SSHWS)
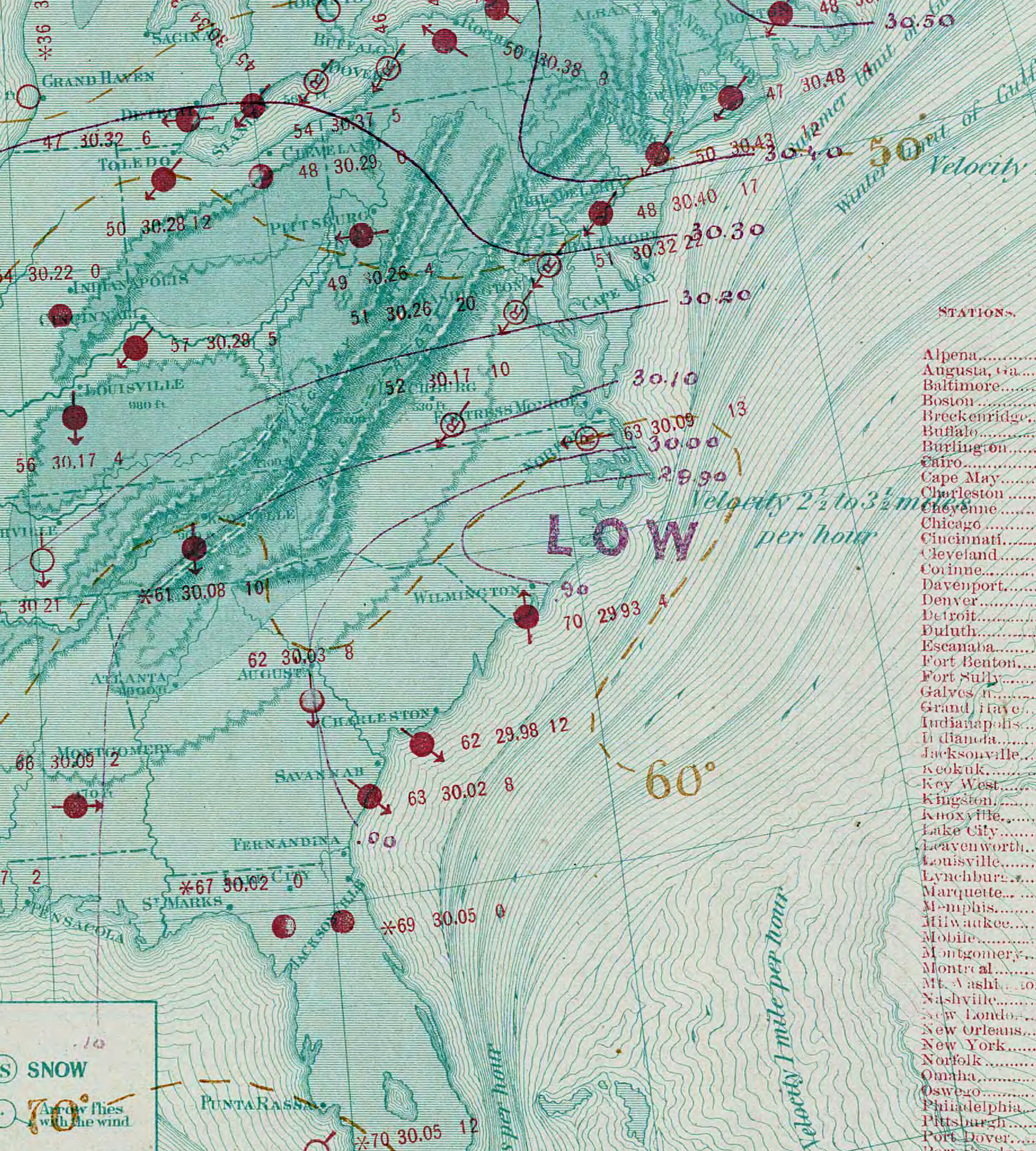
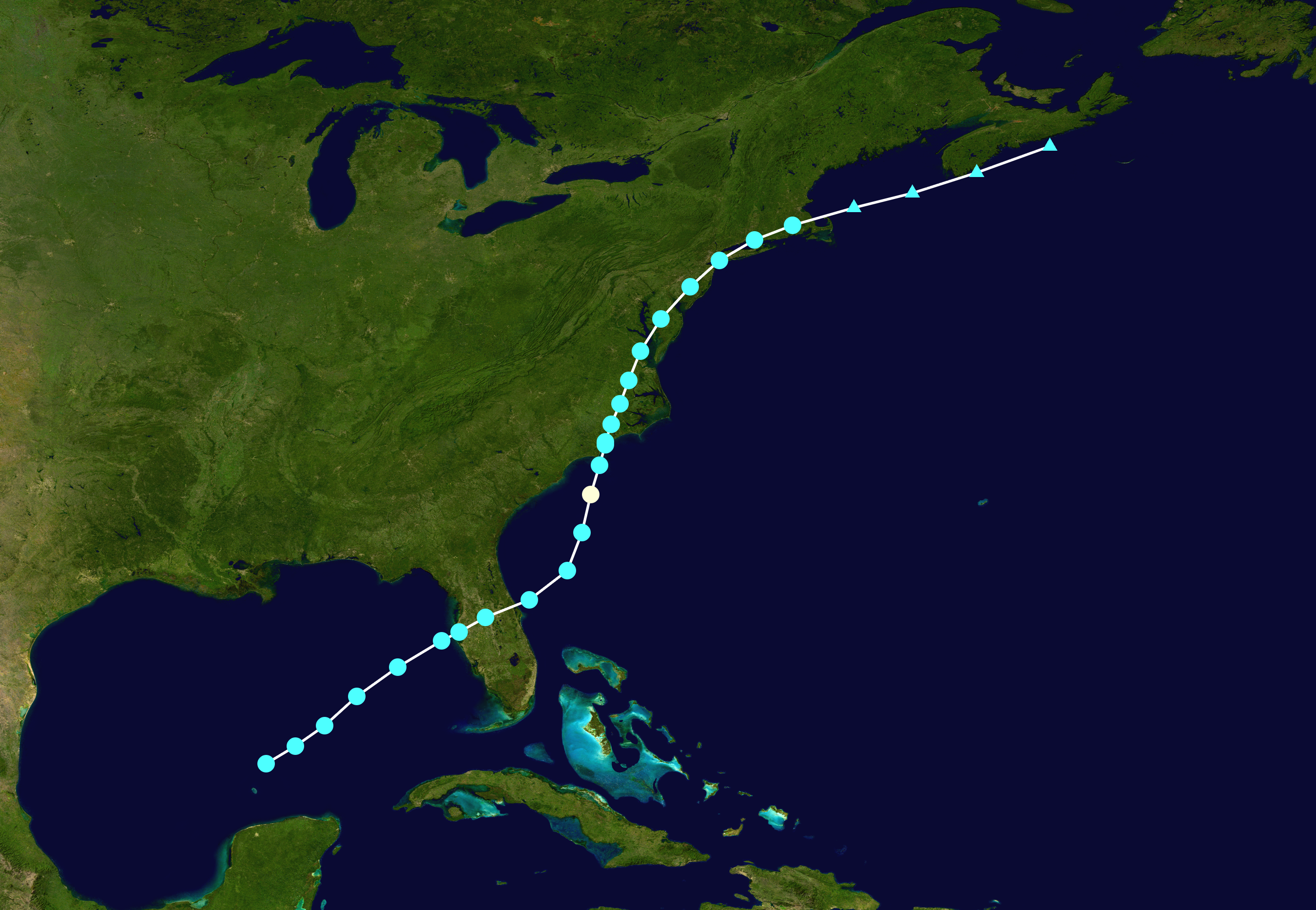
- Duration: October 22 – October 27
- Peak intensity: 80 mph (130 km/h) (1-min);

This hurricane began as a tropical storm about 140 mi (230 km) north of the Yucatán Peninsula early on October 22. Intensifying slightly as it moved northeastward across the Gulf of Mexico, the storm reached winds of 60 mph (95 km/h) prior to making landfall near Clearwater, Florida, around 08:00 UTC on October 23. About 10 hours later, the cyclone emerged into the Atlantic just north of Cape Canaveral and then curved north-northeastward. After briefly reaching hurricane intensity on October 24, the system made landfall near Topsail Beach, North Carolina, early on October 25 with winds of 60 mph (95 km/h). The storm then moved generally northeastward across the Northeastern United States before emerging into the Gulf of Maine on October 27 and becoming extratropical. The system then dissipated just offshore Nova Scotia on the following day. A track for the storm's movement over the East Coast of the United States was included in the October 1872 edition of the Monthly Weather Review, making it one of the earliest cyclone paths to be published by the United States Army Signal Service, a predecessor of the National Weather Service.

Little impact occurred in northeastern Florida, aside from 5.94 in (151 mm) of rainfall in Jacksonville. The Signal Service issued storm warnings along the East Coast of the United States from Wilmington, North Carolina, to New York City. The storm produced 4–8 in (100–200 mm) of rain in Weldon and Tarboro in North Carolina and the Norfolk area in Virginia. In Norfolk, Virginia, 6.29 in (160 mm) of precipitation occurred on October 24, setting a daily record. One two-story brick home collapsed in Richmond, but its occupants were not present. Abnormally high tides impacted many inland waterways in eastern Virginia, including Cameron Run, which reached "almost as high as ever before known", according to the Alexandria Gazette and Virginia Advertiser. Around 2 in (51 mm) of precipitation also fell in many coastal areas of the Mid-Atlantic and New England.

Chenoweth's study begins the track for this storm on August 23 as a tropical depression offshore the Southeastern United States. He argued that the system either did not traverse the Florida peninsula, or was not a cyclone at the time. The study proposed that the cyclone remained well-below hurricane intensity and maintained tropical storm status for only about 18 hours from October 24 to early the next day. Chenoweth also theorizes that it transitioned into an extratropical cyclone over Pennsylvania on October 26.

=== Other storms ===
While HURDAT officially recognizes five systems during the season, Chenoweth's reanalysis suggests that three additional storms formed in the Atlantic in 1872. The first such cyclone is theorized to have developed north of Bermuda on August 27. Moving east-northeastward, on the next day the storm intensified into a hurricane and curved northeastward. Late on August 30, the system became extratropical well east of Newfoundland. On September 5, a tropical depression formed south of the Cabo Verde Islands. The depression moved slowly northwestward and attained tropical storm intensity on the next day. The cyclone turned north-northeastward by September 12 and intensified into a hurricane. However, the system weakened to a tropical storm prior to passing just west of the Azores on September 14 and dissipated by the following day. A third and final unofficial storm developed on October 5 to the south of Hispaniola. Initially moving northwestward, the system soon struck near Santo Domingo, Dominican Republic, and later across the Turks and Caicos Islands later that day. Thereafter, the cyclone moved northeastward or north-northeastward throughout much of the rest of its duration. The storm may have maintained hurricane status for about six days, before weakening back to a tropical storm and promptly dissipating south of Newfoundland on October 12.

== Season effects ==
This is a table of all of the known storms that formed in the 1872 Atlantic hurricane season. It includes their known duration (within the basin), areas affected, damages, and death totals. Deaths in parentheses are additional and indirect (an example of an indirect death would be a traffic accident), but were still related to that storm. Damage and deaths include totals while the storm was extratropical, a wave, or a low, and all of the damage figures are in 1872 USD.

Saffir–Simpson scale
TD	TS	C1	C2	C3	C4	C5

1872 North Atlantic tropical cyclone season statistics
Storm name	Dates active	Storm category at peak intensity	Max 1-min wind mph (km/h)	Min. press. (mbar)	Areas affected	Damage (US$)	Deaths	Ref(s).
One	July 9–13	Tropical storm	60 (95)	Unknown	Gulf Coast of the United States (Louisiana and Mississippi)	Unknown	None	
Two	August 20 – September 1	Category 2 hurricane	105 (165)	Unknown	None	None	None	
Three	September 9–20	Category 1 hurricane	80 (130)	Unknown	Lesser Antilles (Guadeloupe)	Unknown	Unknown	
Four	September 30 – October 6	Category 1 hurricane	80 (130)	Unknown	None	None	None	
Five	October 22–27	Category 1 hurricane	80 (130)	Unknown	East Coast of the United States (Florida and South Carolina)	Unknown	None	
Season aggregates
5 systems	July 9 – October 27		105 (165)	Unknown		Unknown	Unknown	

== See also ==
- List of Florida hurricanes (pre-1900)
- Tropical cyclone observation
