= 1881 Atlantic hurricane season =

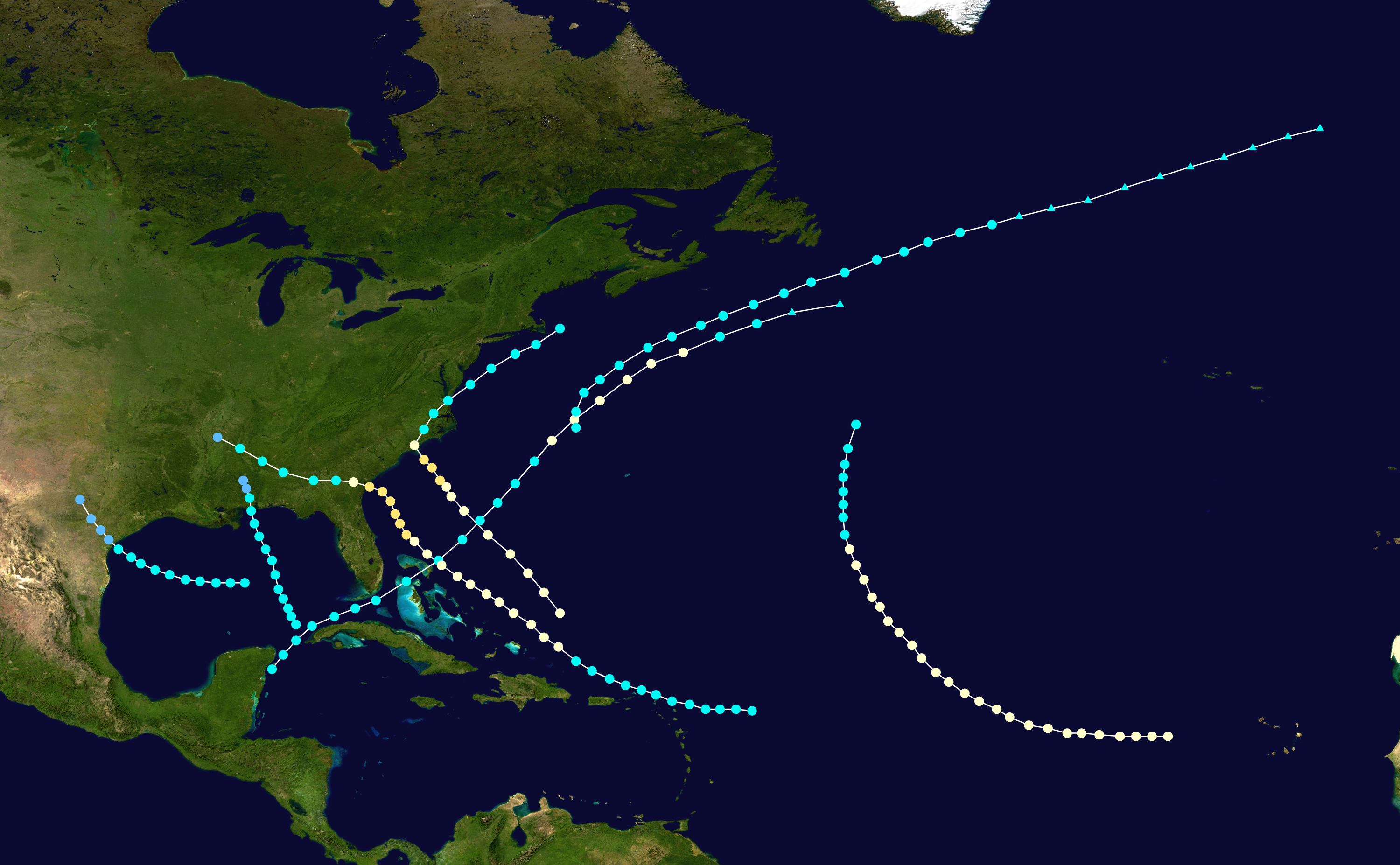
- Season summary map

Seasonal boundaries
- First system formed: August 1, 1881
- Last system dissipated: September 22, 1881

Strongest storm
- Name: Five
  - Maximum winds: 105 mph (165 km/h) (1-minute sustained)
  - Lowest pressure: 970 mbar (hPa; 28.64 inHg)

Seasonal statistics
- Total storms: 7
- Hurricanes: 4
- Major hurricanes (Cat. 3+): 0
- Total fatalities: >700
- Total damage: $1.8 million (1881 USD)

The 1881 Atlantic hurricane season featured a tropical cyclone that remains one of the deadliest in the history of the United States. Seven tropical storms are known to have developed, four of which strengthened into hurricanes, though none of those intensified into a major hurricane. (Note: A major hurricane is a storm that ranks as Category 3 or higher on the Saffir–Simpson hurricane wind scale.) However, in the absence of modern satellite and other remote-sensing technologies, only storms that affected populated land areas or encountered ships at sea were recorded, so the actual total could be higher. In 2004, meteorologist Christopher Landsea concluded that the official hurricane database (HURDAT) excludes zero to six tropical cyclones per year between 1851 and 1885 and zero to four per year between 1886 and 1910.

Of the known 1881 cyclones, the third and seventh systems were both first documented in 1996 by José Fernández-Partagás and Henry F. Diaz. They also proposed changes to the known tracks of fourth and fifth storms. Later, the Atlantic hurricane reanalysis project did not add or remove any cyclones from HURDAT. However, climate researcher Michael Chenoweth authored a reanalysis study, published in 2014, which concluded that the 1881 season featured a total of twelve tropical cyclones. This included the removal of the second system and the addition of six previously undocumented storms, for a net gain of five cyclones. Chenoweth also proposed some alterations to the track and intensity of each storm, but these changes have yet to be incorporated into HURDAT.

The first storm of the season was first noted over the southeastern Gulf of Mexico on August 1. Two days later, the cyclone struck Alabama and dissipated on August 4 over east-central Mississippi. August featured five systems, with the season's fifth storm peaking as a Category 2 hurricane on the present-day Saffir–Simpson scale. Making landfall in Georgia, the cyclone caused approximately 700 deaths and at least $1.7 million (1881 USD) in damage in the state and in South Carolina. (Note: All damage figures are in 1881 USD, unless otherwise noted) In September, the season's sixth storm, a Category 2 hurricane also struck North Carolina, inflicting about a damage total of about $100,000. Additionally, the fifth and sixth systems caused numerous fatalities due to ships capsizing. The season's seventh and final system transitioned into an extratropical cyclone well east of Newfoundland on September 22.

== Season summary ==
Deadliest United States hurricanes
Rank	Hurricane	Season	Fatalities
1	4 "Galveston"	1900	8,000–12,000
2	4 "San Ciriaco"	1899	3,400
3	5 Maria	2017	2,982
4	5 "Okeechobee"	1928	2,823
5	4 "Cheniere Caminada"	1893	2,000
6	5 Katrina	2005	1,392
7	3 "Sea Islands"	1893	1,000–2,000
8	3 "Indianola"	1875	771
9	4 "Florida Keys"	1919	745
10	2 "Georgia"	1881	700
Reference: NOAA, GWU (Note: The storm category color indicates the intensity of the hurricane when landfalling in the U.S.)

The Atlantic hurricane database (HURDAT) recognizes seven tropical cyclones for the 1881 season. Of the seven systems, four intensified into a hurricane, but none strengthened into a major hurricane. José Fernández-Partagás and Henry F. Diaz first documented the third and seventh systems in their 1996 re-analysis of the season. In 2003, the Atlantic hurricane reanalysis project only made a significant track revision to the sixth storm. A reanalysis by climate researcher Michael Chenoweth, published in 2014, adds six storms and removes one, the second system. Chenoweth's study utilizes a more extensive collection of newspapers and ship logs, as well as late 19th century weather maps for the first time, in comparison to previous reanalysis projects. However, Chenoweth's proposals have yet to be incorporated into HURDAT.

Based on observations, the track of the first known system begins over the southeastern Gulf of Mexico on August 1. A few days later, the storm struck the Gulf Coast of the United States and caused flooding in the region. Four other cyclones formed in August, all but one of which made landfall. Most notably, the season's fifth cyclone peaked as a Category 2 hurricane on the Saffir–Simpson scale with sustained winds of 105 mph (165 km/h) and a minimum atmospheric pressure of 970 mbar (29 inHg). That storm caused several deaths due to maritime incidents prior to making landfall in Georgia. Overall, it caused more than $1.7 million in damage and approximately 700 fatalities, making it one of the deadliest cyclones in the United States. At the time, this storm ranked as the country's second deadliest, behind only the 1875 Indianola hurricane.

At least two additional storms developed in September. The first of the two, the season's sixth cyclone, reached an intensity similar to the fifth system. An unknown number of people drowned after it sank the Anne J. Palmer. After striking North Carolina, the hurricane caused severe damage over coastal portions of the state, totaling about $100,000. On September 18, the final known cyclone was first noted northwest of Bermuda. Moving generally northeastward, the storm transitioned into an extratropical cyclone on September 22.

The season's activity was reflected with an accumulated cyclone energy (ACE) rating of 59, ahead of only 1885 and tied with 1882 for the lowest total of the 1880s. ACE is a metric used to express the energy used by a tropical cyclone during its lifetime. Therefore, a storm with a longer duration will have higher values of ACE. It is only calculated at six-hour increments in which specific tropical and subtropical systems are either at or above sustained wind speeds of 39 mph (63 km/h), which is the threshold for tropical storm intensity. Thus, tropical depressions are not included here.

== Systems ==
=== Tropical Storm One ===
- Tropical storm (SSHWS)
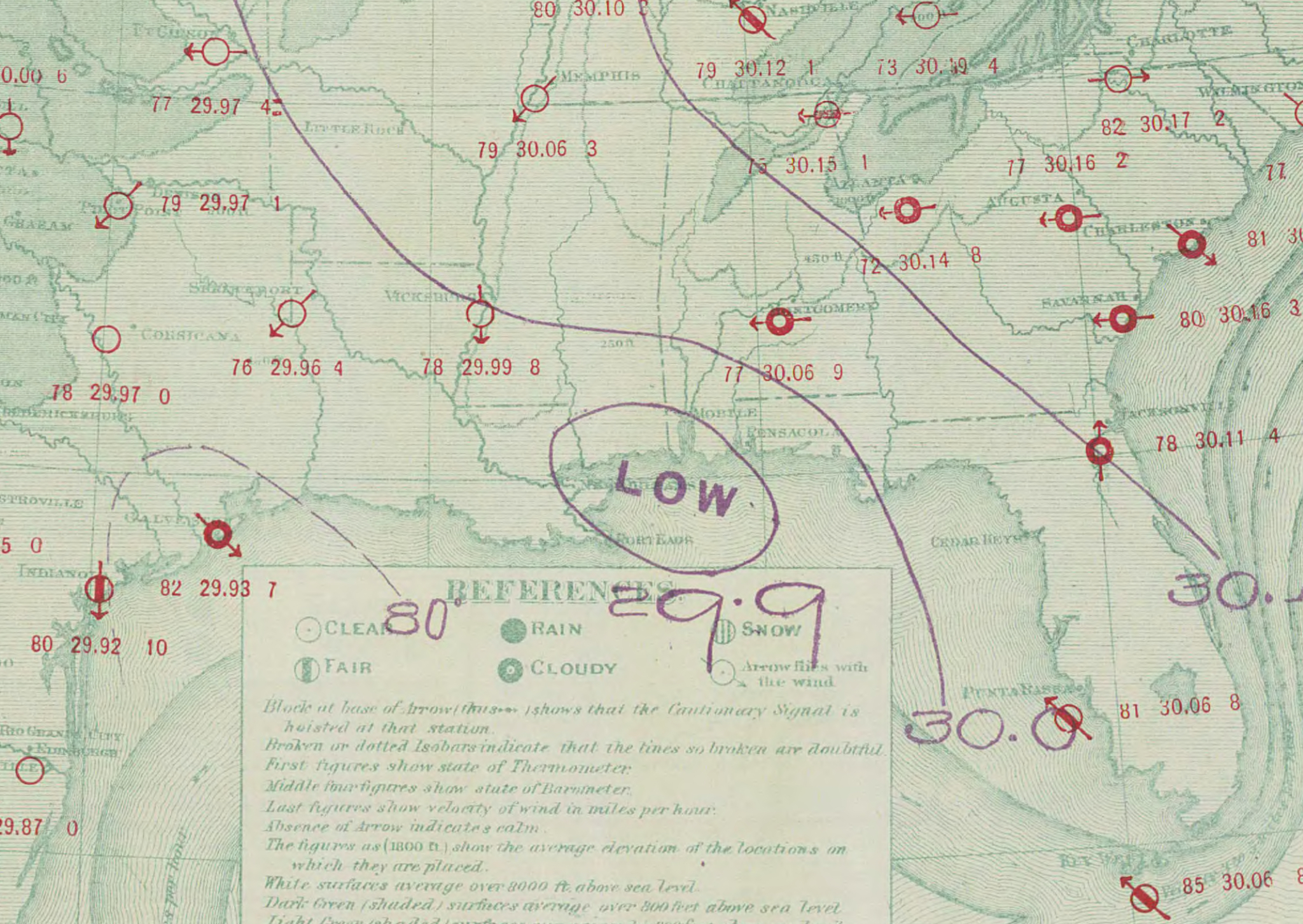
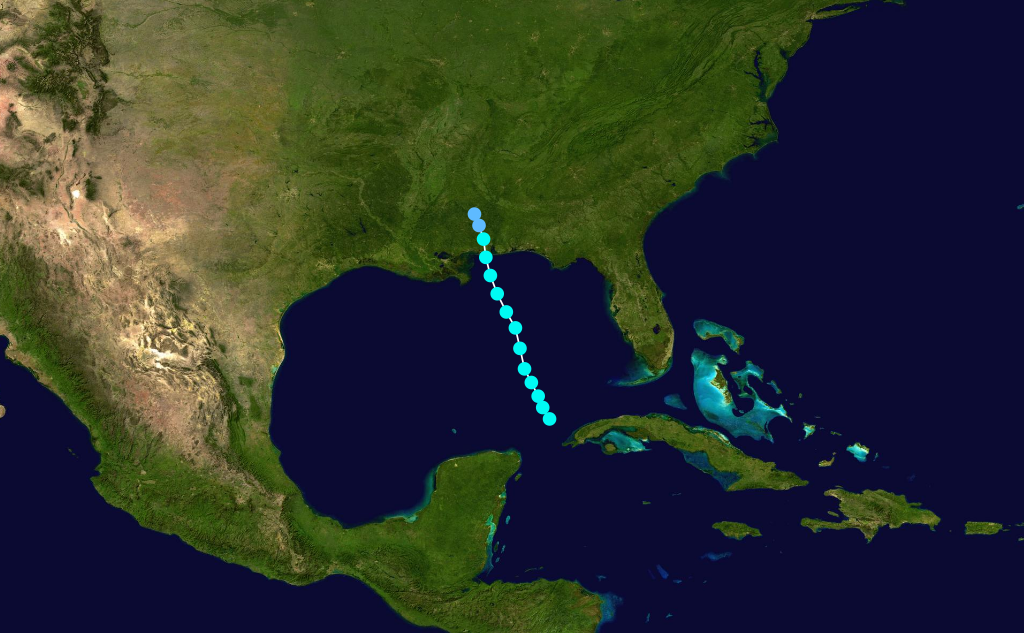
- Duration: August 1 – August 4
- Peak intensity: 60 mph (95 km/h) (1-min);

Observations suggest the presence of a tropical storm over the southern Gulf of Mexico on August 1. The storm moved generally north-northwestward across the Gulf of Mexico before striking Dauphin Island, Alabama, and then near the Alabama-Mississippi state line on August 3 with winds of 60 mph (95 km/h). An assessment of the storm by the Atlantic hurricane reanalysis project estimated that it weakened to a tropical depression early the following day, shortly before dissipating over east-central Mississippi.

Heavy rains fell along the Gulf Coast of the United States, including up to 15.8 in (400 mm) from August 2 to August 5 in Pensacola, Florida. Floodwaters reached 3 ft (0.91 m) above ground in the nearby community of Millview, forcing residents to evacuate. The storm also beached a few fishing smacks and the schooner Ella, which was loaded with a cargo of lumber. Climate researcher Michael Chenoweth argued that this storm actually developed as a tropical depression offshore North Carolina on July 26. The cyclone intensified into a hurricane as it moved generally southwestward, but degenerated into a tropical wave before crossing southern Florida on July 30. The remnants developed into a cyclone on August 2 over the central Gulf of Mexico and turned northward, striking Mississippi on the next day.

=== Tropical Storm Two ===
- Tropical storm (SSHWS)
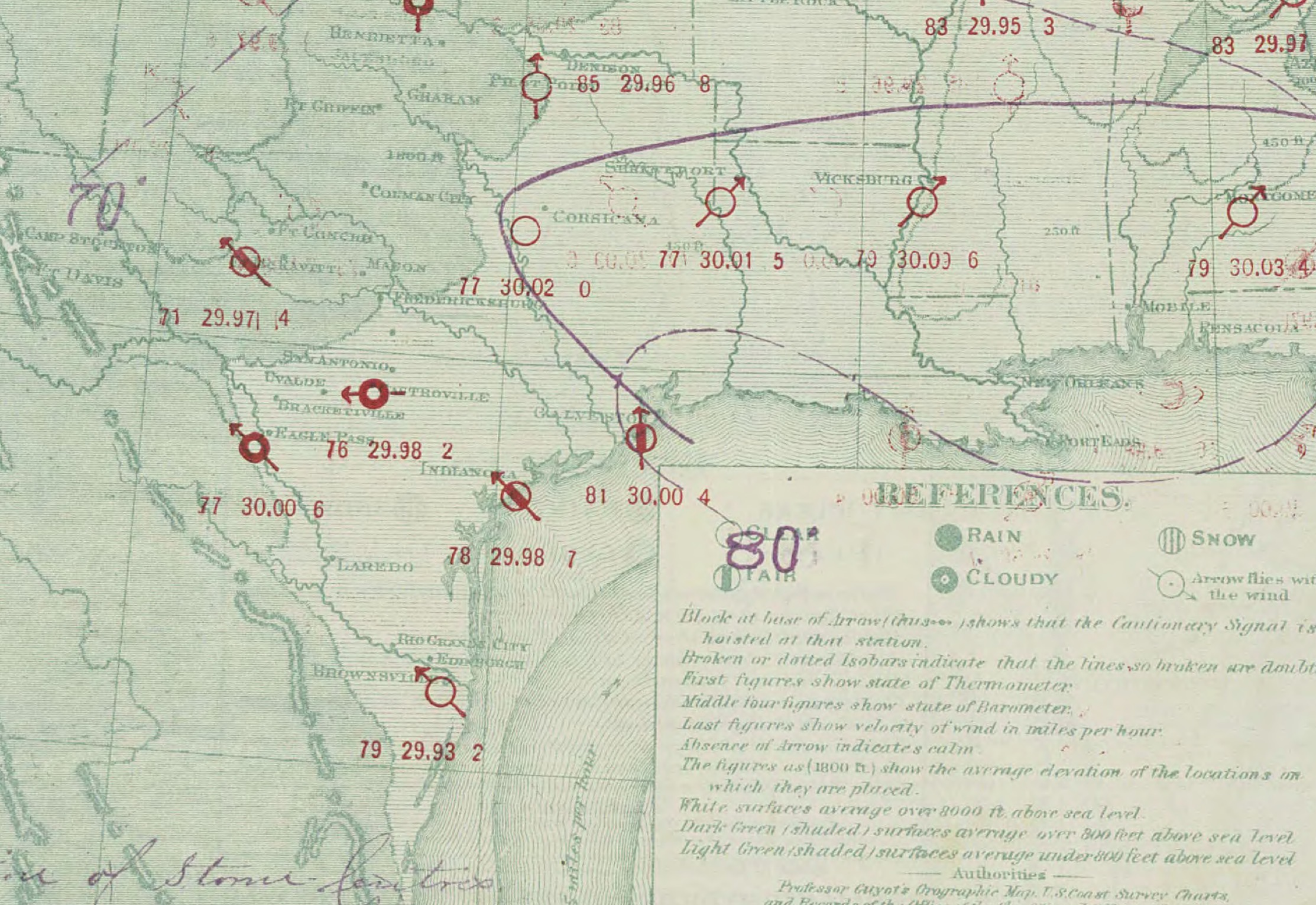
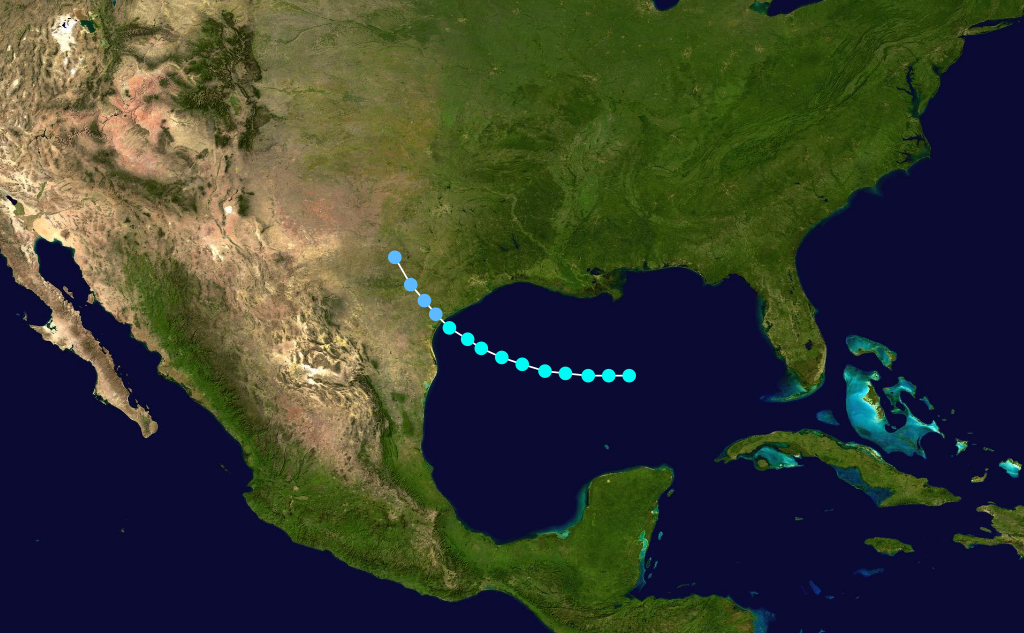
- Duration: August 11 – August 14
- Peak intensity: 45 mph (75 km/h) (1-min);

Little information exists on this storm beyond the 1960 reanalysis by Gordon E. Dunn and Banner I. Miller. The Atlantic hurricane reanalysis project concluded that a tropical storm existed near the center of the Gulf of Mexico by August 11. Moving westward and then northwestward by the following day, the cyclone made landfall near Corpus Christi, Texas, at 21:00 UTC on August 13 with winds of 45 mph (75 km/h). Early the next day, the storm weakened to a tropical depression and dissipated over Mason County several hours later. Signals were blown down at the harbor, and one boat was lost. Chenoweth could not confirm the existence of this system as a tropical cyclone, noting "No storm in Texas press accounts" and that Dunn and Miller's 1960 reanalysis misdated a hurricane in 1880.

=== Hurricane Three ===
- Category 1 hurricane (SSHWS)
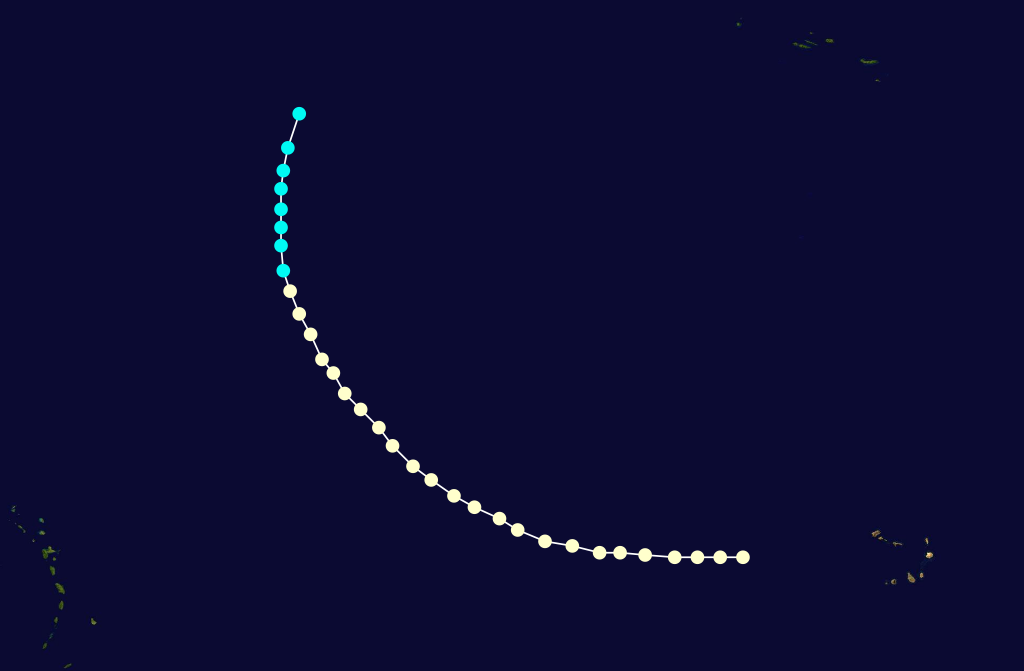
- Duration: August 11 – August 18
- Peak intensity: 90 mph (150 km/h) (1-min);

With The Times noting that the brigantine Fonthill "encountered a tremendous hurricane with a heavy cross sea" over the far eastern Atlantic on August 11, the Atlantic hurricane reanalysis project initiated the track on that day approximately 375 mi (605 km) west of the Cabo Verde Islands, with sustained winds already at 90 mph (150 km/h). After initially moving westward, the hurricane turned northwestward by August 13. The cyclone is estimated to have weakened to a tropical storm on August 17, by which time it turned northward. No evidence of this storm exists past August 18, when the official track ceases about 780 mi (1,255 km) south-southeast Cape Race, Newfoundland. The study by Chenoweth develops this system as a tropical depression on August 11. Moving in a more pronounced northwestward direction, the cyclone steadily intensified into a hurricane by the next day. By August 18, the storm turned northeastward, three days before becoming extratropical.

=== Hurricane Four ===
- Category 1 hurricane (SSHWS)
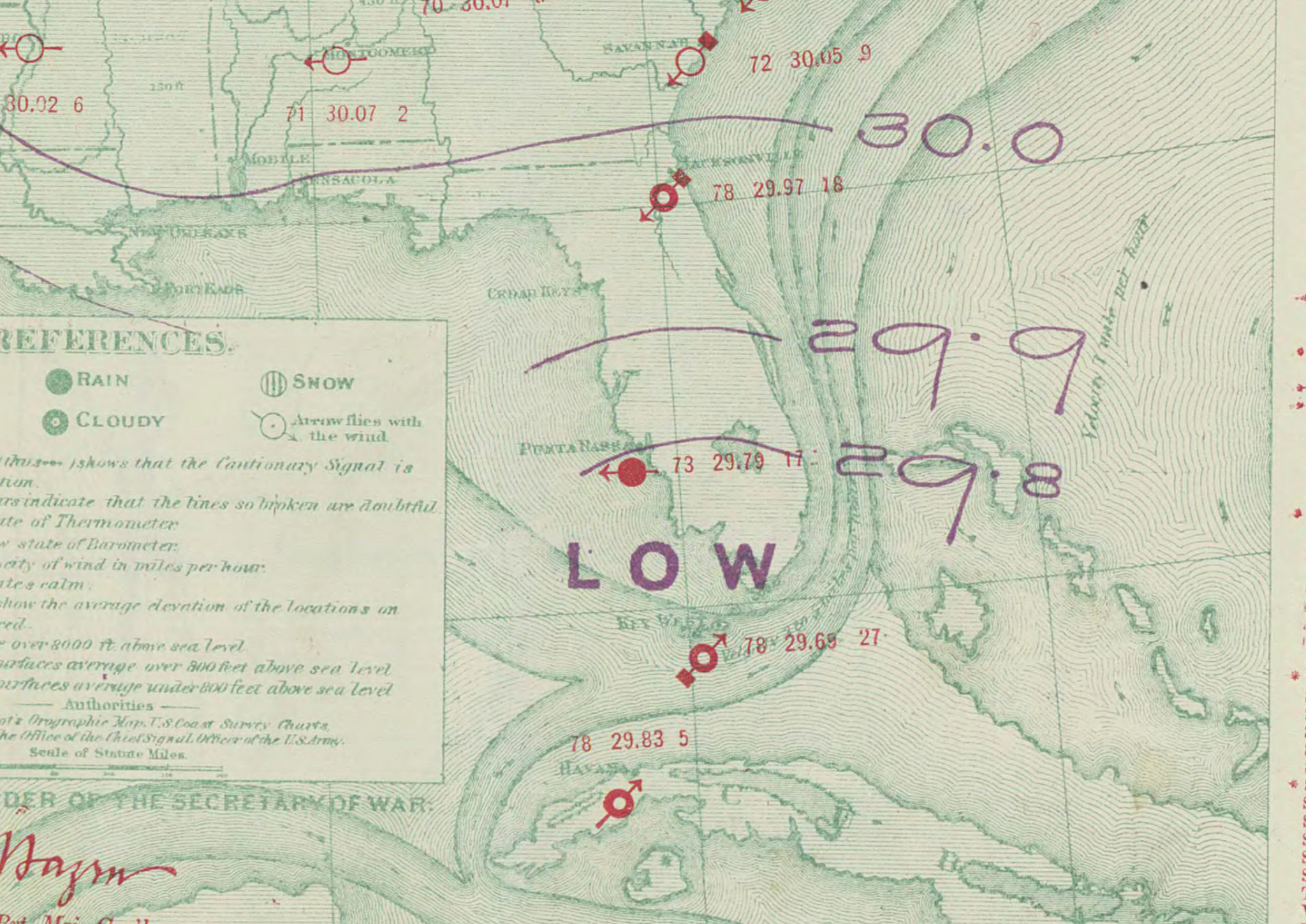
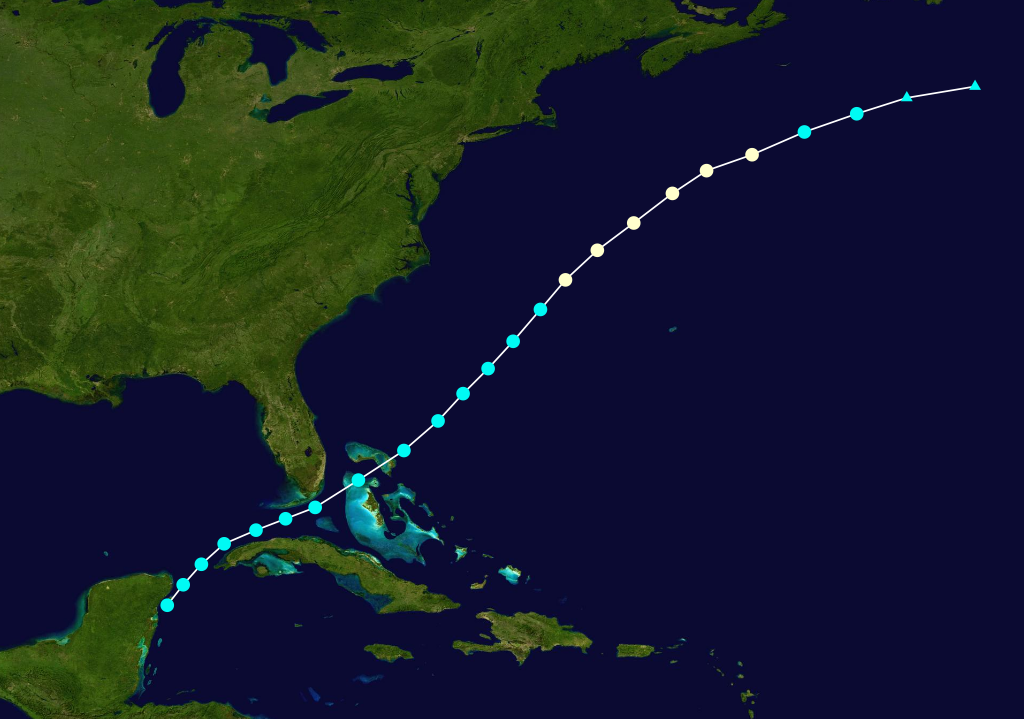
- Duration: August 16 – August 21
- Peak intensity: 80 mph (130 km/h) (1-min);

Land-based observations from the Gulf Coast of the United States attest to the existence of this storm beginning on August 16, while the cyclone's track in HURDAT is listed as beginning close to Cozumel. Moving northeastward on August 16 and then east-northeastward on the next day, the system avoided striking Cuba and Florida as it traversed the Straits of Florida. However, the cyclone resumed a northeastward motion on August 17 and passed through the Bahamas between then and early on the following day, making landfall on the Abaco Islands. Based on reports from the ships Anna and Cohasset, the storm intensified into a hurricane on August 19 and peaked with winds of 80 mph (130 km/h). It weakened to a tropical storm on August 21 and became extratropical the same day approximately 280 mi (450 km) east-southeast of Sable Island, Nova Scotia.

In Cuba, the storm dropped heavy rainfall in Havana. The Gulf Coast of the United States reported elevated winds from Florida to Louisiana, but sustained winds remained under tropical storm-force, while Key West and Punta Rassa in the former also recorded heavy precipitation. Chenoweth proposed that this storm developed as a tropical depression offshore Cape Coral, Florida, on August 16. After moving south-southeastward toward the Florida Keys, the cyclone turned northeastward and made landfall near present-day Everglades City as a minimal hurricane. Early on August 18, the hurricane exited the state near West Palm Beach and remained north of the Bahamas.

=== Hurricane Five ===
- Category 2 hurricane (SSHWS)
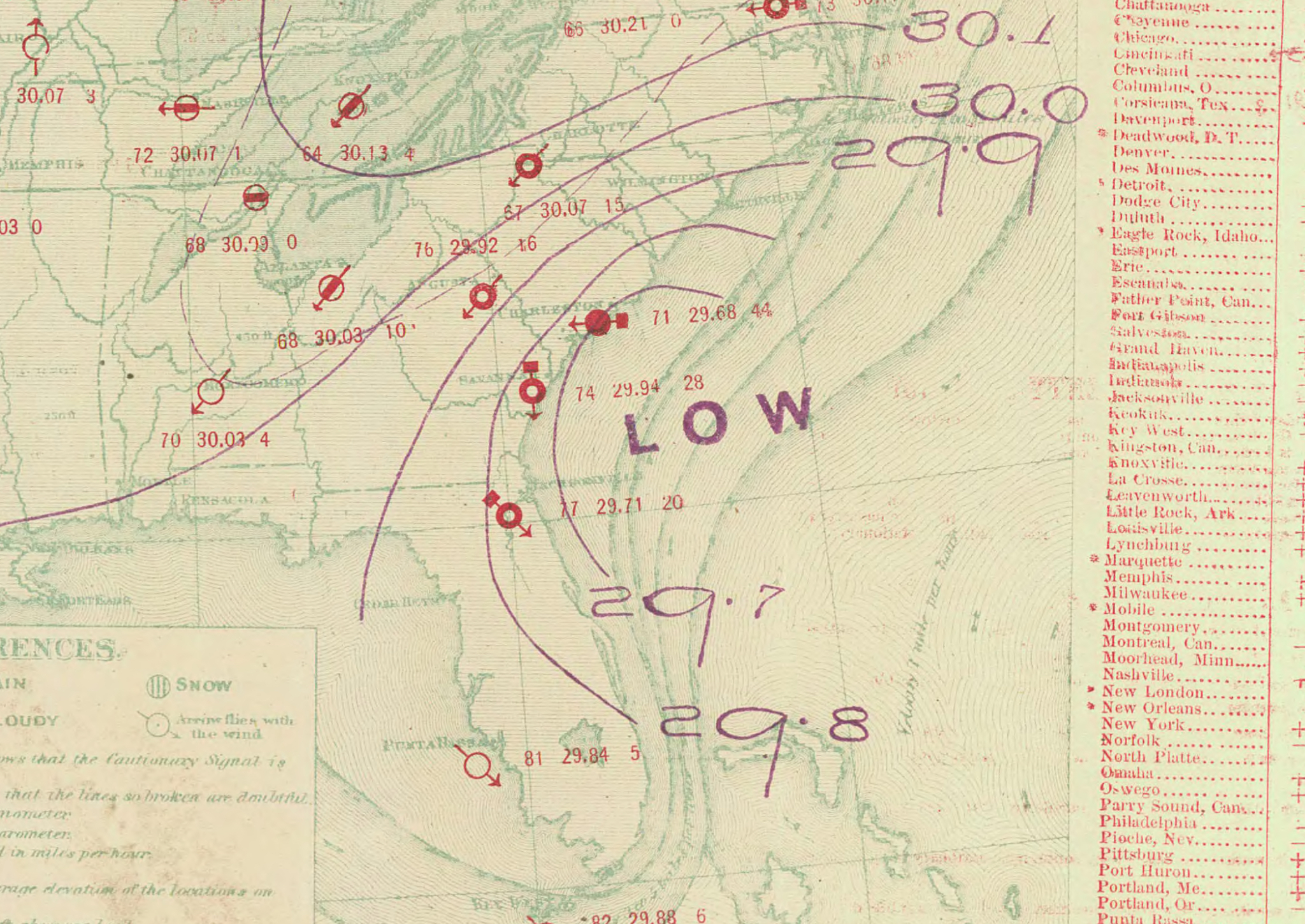
- Duration: August 21 – August 29
- Peak intensity: 105 mph (165 km/h) (1-min); 970 mbar (hPa)

The Atlantic hurricane reanalysis project concluded that this storm formed just east of the Lesser Antilles on August 21, one day before the cyclone passed north of the islands. Moving northwestward, the system intensified, reaching hurricane status early on August 24. The hurricane passed northeast of the Abaco Islands in the Bahamas two days later and strengthened into a Category 2 hurricane on the present-day Saffir–Simpson scale, peaking with maximum sustained winds of 105 mph (165 km/h). After moving north-northwestward late on August 26 and early the next day, the storm then turned west-northwestward. Around 02:00 UTC on August 28, the hurricane made landfall in Georgia between St. Simons Island and Savannah, likely at the same intensity. Upon the cyclone moving ashore, the Atlantic hurricane reanalysis project estimated that it had a barometric pressure of 970 mbar (29 inHg). Thereafter, the storm briefly moved westward and quickly weakened to a tropical storm within 10 hours of moving inland. By early on August 29, the system turned northwestward and weakened to a tropical depression later that day, before dissipating near the Arkansas-Mississippi state line.

Chenoweth proposed a more consistent northwestward movement of this storm, leading to a landfall around Hilton Head Island, South Carolina, instead of in Georgia. He also argued that the cyclone persisted longer inland, dissipating over Missouri on August 30.

Between August 26 and August 27, the ship Sandusky encountered the storm, with the loss of all but two people, while most of the crew of the Hannah M. Lallis also drowned. Landfall coincided with high tide and proved very destructive as several barrier islands were completely submerged by storm surge. In Savannah, Georgia, few structures escaped damage, with the Monthly Weather Review noting that "nearly every house received a copious supply of salt water." in the Bohanville section of the city. A number of streets were blocked, especially by large trees and the remnants of tin roofs. Property damage in the city reached about $1.5 million. Approximately 100 ships capsized in the vicinity of Savannah. A barometer recorded a pressure of 984.76 mbar (29.08 inHg), while a wind speed of 80 mph (130 km/h) was observed before the anemometer was destroyed. At least 335 people died in Savannah alone. Tybee Island was also among the localities severely impacted. There, the storm demolished rows of cottages and even some of the sturdiest homes. Additionally, South Carolina experienced extensive coastal flooding. In Charleston, several feet of water submerged areas east of East Bay Street and inundated many properties in the southwest sections of city. Substantial damage to businesses, fences, roofs, telegraph wires, and trees were also reported. Damage in the city ranged from $200,000 to $300,000. Overall, the storm caused an estimated 700 fatalities, making the hurricane among the deadliest to strike the United States.

=== Hurricane Six ===
- Category 2 hurricane (SSHWS)
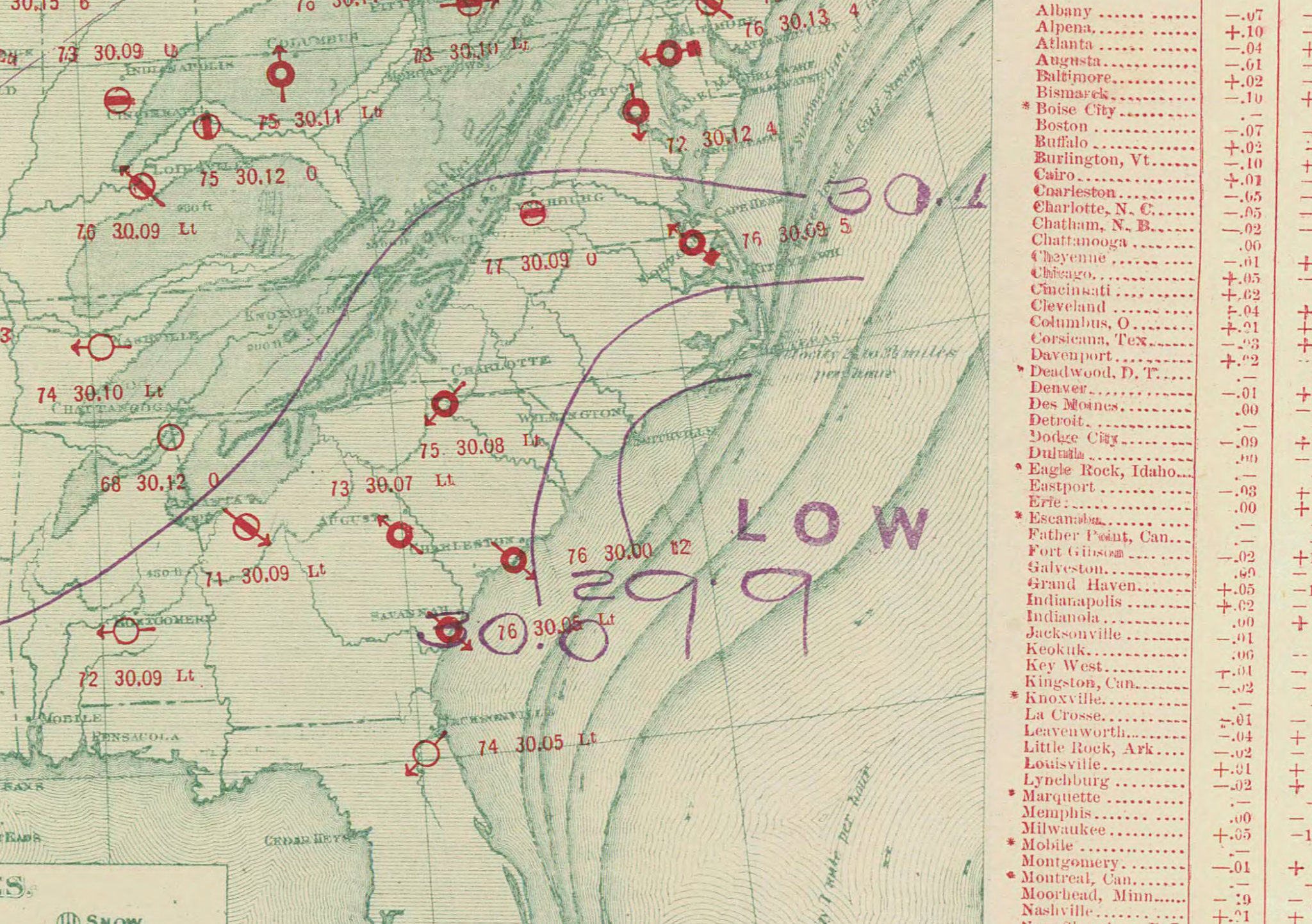
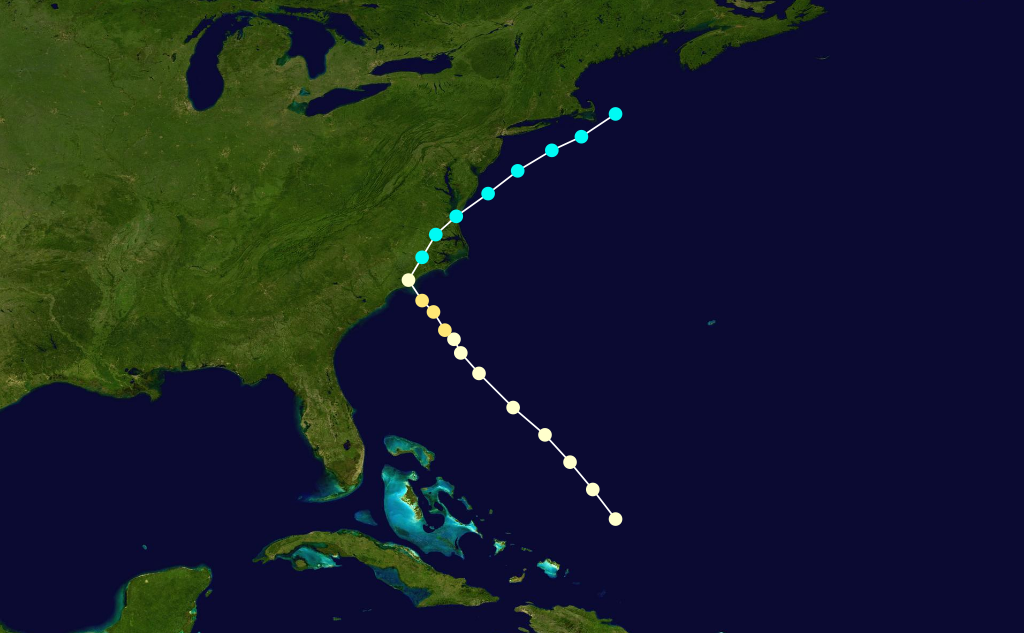
- Duration: September 7 – September 11
- Peak intensity: 105 mph (165 km/h) (1-min); ≤975 mbar (hPa)

The Anne J. Palmer first encountered this storm on September 7 before capsizing in rough seas that day. Thus, the Atlantic hurricane reanalysis project decided to begin the track for this cyclone at that time to the northeast of the Turks and Caicos Islands as a Category 1 hurricane. Moving northeastward, the storm intensified slightly, becoming a Category 2 hurricane with maximum sustained winds of 105 mph (165 km/h) early on September 9, several hours prior to making landfall in present-day Oak Island, North Carolina. The Atlantic hurricane reanalysis project estimated that upon landfall, the storm had a barometric pressure of 975 mbar (28.8 inHg). Rapidly weakening to a tropical storm by early on September 10, the cyclone then turned northeastward, passing close to Wilmington–Wrightsville Beach area and later near Norfolk, Virginia, before re-emerging into the Atlantic that day. The cyclone was last noted only 50 mi (80 km) offshore Massachusetts on September 11. One of the few changes proposed by Chenoweth's 2014 study was the extension of the storm's duration and track back to September 3, as a tropical depression east of the Windward Islands.

An unknown number of deaths occurred when the Anne J. Palmer capsized, with only one person surviving. In North Carolina, the storm uprooted trees and demolished buildings at both Smithville (present-day Southport) and Wilmington. An anemometer at Wilmington indicated sustained wind speeds of 90 mph (150 km/h) before it was destroyed. At least 600 bushels of peanuts suffered damage after a warehouse lost its roof. Wilmington also entirely lost communications outside the city after winds toppled many telephone and telegraph wires. Damage in North Carolina totaled approximately $100,000. The hurricane weakened to a tropical storm over land, bringing heavy, yet beneficial, precipitation to other states, including the first rainfall in Washington, D.C. in 33 days.

=== Tropical Storm Seven ===
- Tropical storm (SSHWS)
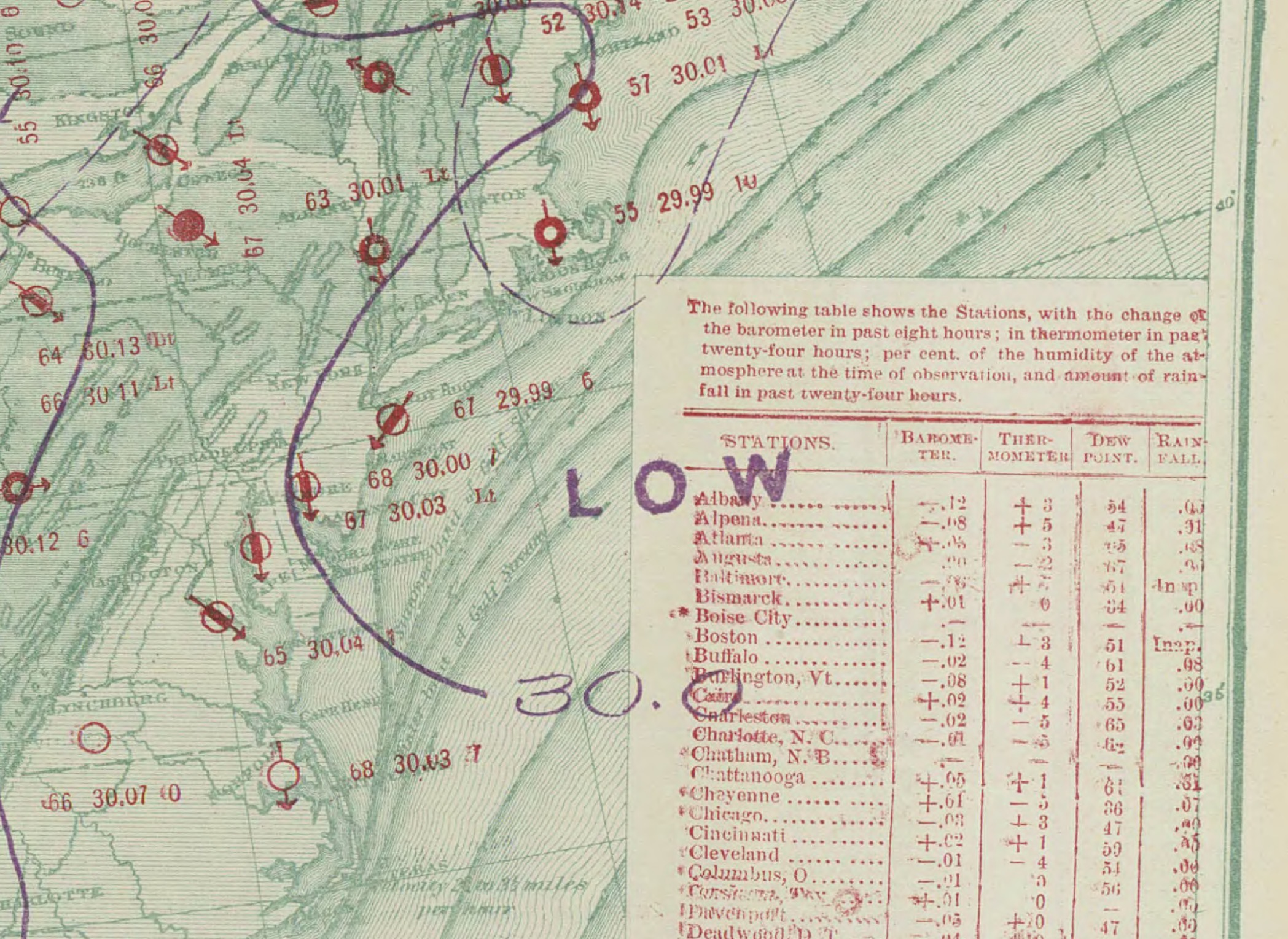
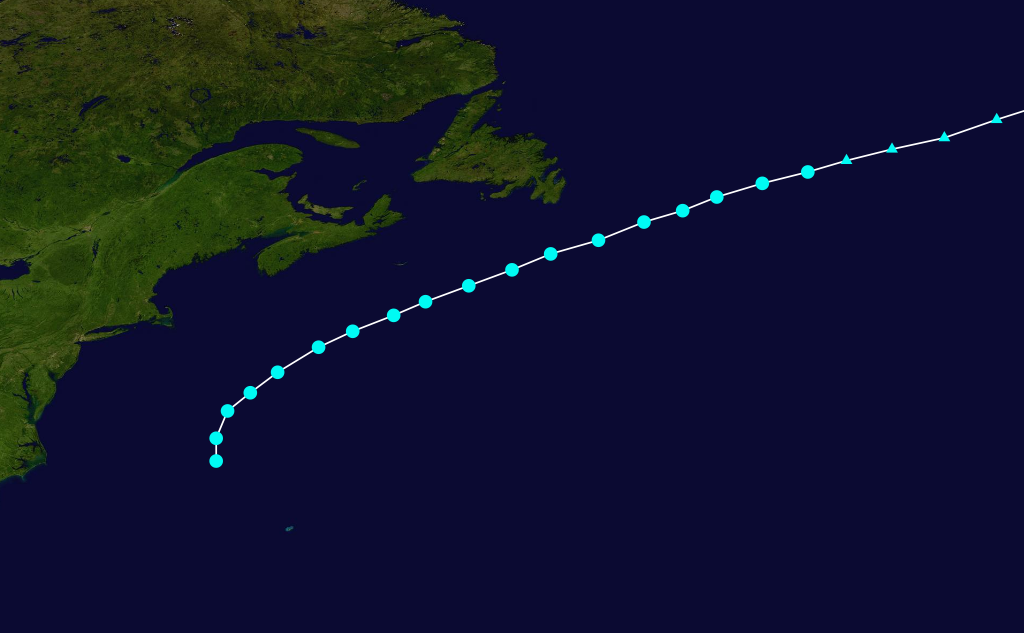
- Duration: September 18 – September 22
- Peak intensity: 70 mph (110 km/h) (1-min);

The bark J.E. Fisher first encountered this storm on September 18, leading the Atlantic hurricane database to begin the track about 270 mi (435 km) northwest of Bermuda. After initially trekking to the northwest, the storm curved to northeastward and moved in that direction for the remainder of its duration. According to ship records, the system likely remained just below hurricane intensity, with winds reaching 70 mph (110 km/h) on September 19. It weakened over the north Atlantic, becoming extratropical on September 22 about 575 mi (925 km) east of Newfoundland and fully dissipating by September 24. Chenoweth did not propose significant changes to this storm's track or duration, but started it as a hurricane, which peaked with winds of 90 mph (150 km/h). On September 21, the cyclone weakened to a tropical storm.

=== Other storms ===
Chenoweth proposed six storms not currently listed in HURDAT. The first such system formed well east of the Lesser Antilles on August 23. After moving generally northwestward for several days, the cyclone trekked mostly northeastward, with the exception of a northward jog, until dissipating on September 6 over the central Atlantic. A second unofficial system developed on August 27 north of Barbados and headed north-northwestward across Leeward Islands before dissipating on August 29 near Saint Martin. Chenoweth's third new storm developed near Eleuthera in the Bahamas on October 15. The cyclone meandered slowly near or over the island for nearly 30 hours, but then turned southwestward and dissipated on October 17 near the north end of Exuma. None of these aforementioned storms strengthened beyond tropical storm status.

A fourth unofficial system developed well east of the Lesser Antilles on October 16. The cyclone initially moved west-northwestward, before turning northwestward two days later, followed by a northeastward curve on October 21 until its extratropical transition west-northwest of the Azores on October 23. This storm maintained major hurricane status from October 18 to early on October 21, peaking as a Category 3 hurricane with winds of 120 mph (195 km/h). Another storm formed northeast of the Lesser Antilles on November 9. Moving erratically for about a week, during which time it held hurricane intensity on November 10, the cyclone turned northeastward on November 16. The storm transitioned into an extratropical system two day later to the southwest of the Azores. Chenoweth's final proposed system formed well east of the Lesser Antilles on December 7 and moved slowly westward before dissipating the next day.

== See also ==
- Atlantic hurricane season
- Tropical cyclone observation
- Atlantic hurricane reanalysis project
