= 1881 Georgia hurricane =

A Category 2 hurricane that affected Georgia

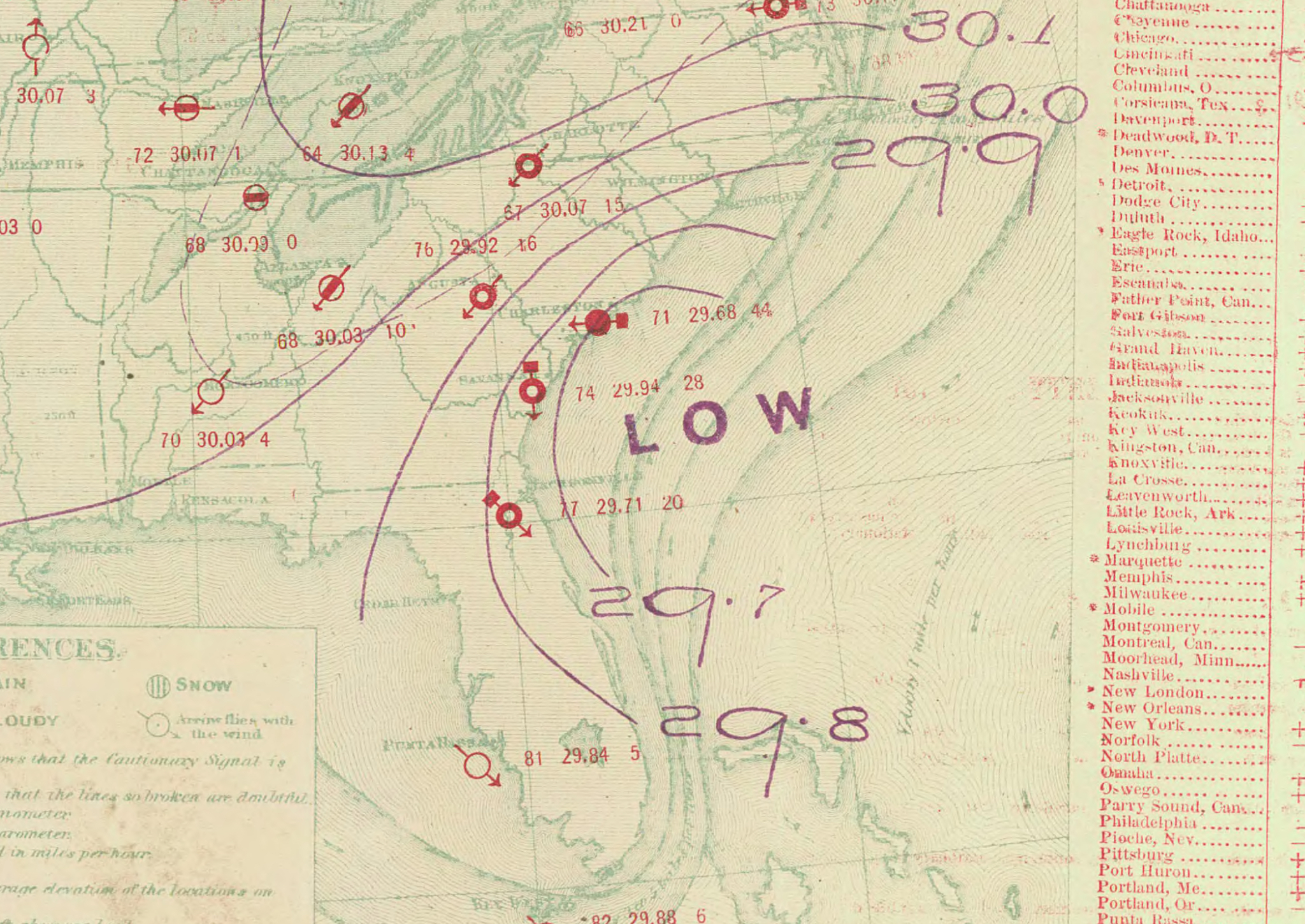
- Surface weather map of the hurricane approaching landfall in Georgia on August 27

Meteorological history
- Formed: August 21, 1881
- Dissipated: August 29, 1881

Category 2 hurricane
- 1-minute sustained (SSHWS/NWS)
- Highest winds: 105 mph (165 km/h)
- Lowest pressure: 970 mbar (hPa); 28.64 inHg

Overall effects
- Fatalities: ~700
- Damage: >$1.7 million (1881 USD)
- Areas affected: Southeastern United States (especially Georgia)
- Part of the 1881 Atlantic hurricane season

The 1881 Georgia hurricane was one of the deadliest tropical cyclones in the history of the United States. Confirmed by the Atlantic hurricane reanalysis project to have existed by August 21 just east of the Lesser Antilles, the cyclone moved west-northwestward to northwestward as a tropical storm, until intensifying into a hurricane on August 24. Further strengthening occurred, with the storm becoming at least a Category 2 hurricane on the Saffir–Simpson scale with maximum sustained winds of 105 mph (165 km/h). The system likely remained a Category 2 hurricane through its landfall in Georgia between St. Simons Island and Savannah early on August 28. Weaking to a tropical storm several hours later, the storm continued to move farther inland over the Southern United States until dissipating near the Arkansas-Mississippi state line on the following day.

Early in the storm's duration, the Lesser Antilles experienced some gusty winds, rainfall, and rough seas, beaching or destroying some vessels on Guadeloupe and Saint Thomas. As the system approached the Southeastern United States, an unknown number of people perished after being swept overboard on the ships Hannah M. Lallis and Sandusky. In Georgia, storm surge and abnormally high tides generated by the cyclone submerged several barrier islands, especially in the vicinity of Savannah. The city itself experienced about $1.5 million (1881 USD) in damage and at least 335 deaths. (Note: All damage figures are in 1881 USD, unless otherwise noted) A lasting impact of the storm was the collapse of coastal Georgia's rice industry, compounded by increasing competition from other states. Similar effects occurred in South Carolina, while Charleston alone reported $200,000 to $300,000 in damage. Overall, the storm caused approximately 700 fatalities, making the hurricane among the deadliest to strike the United States.

== Meteorological history ==
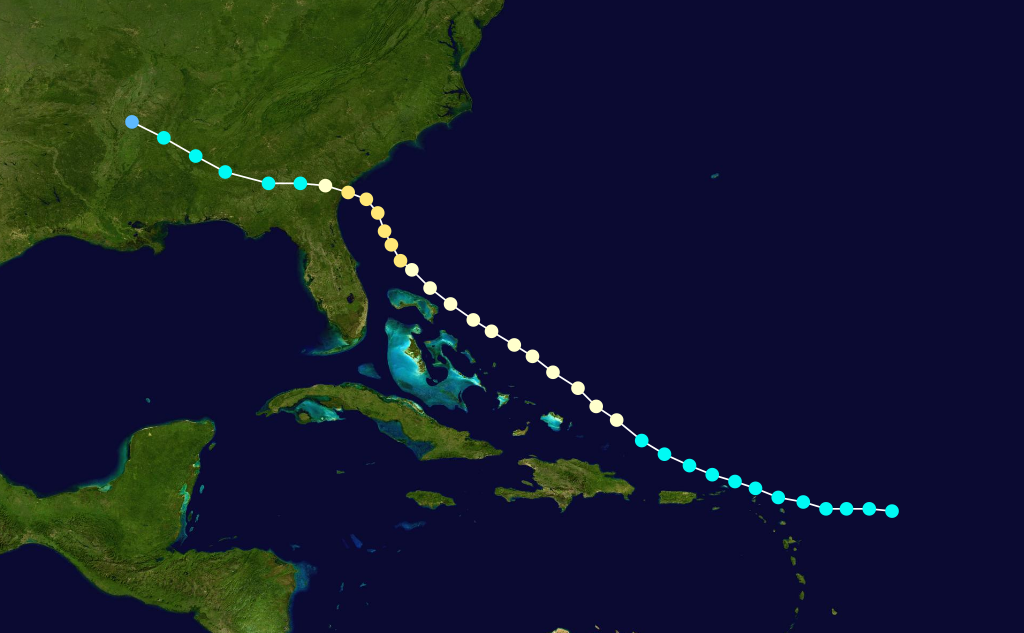
Map plotting the storm's track and intensity, according to the Saffir–Simpson scale Map key Saffir–Simpson scale Tropical depression (≤38 mph, ≤62 km/h) Tropical storm (39–73 mph, 63–118 km/h) Category 1 (74–95 mph, 119–153 km/h) Category 2 (96–110 mph, 154–177 km/h) Category 3 (111–129 mph, 178–208 km/h) Category 4 (130–156 mph, 209–251 km/h) Category 5 (≥157 mph, ≥252 km/h) Unknown Storm type Tropical cyclone Subtropical cyclone Extratropical cyclone, remnant low, tropical disturbance, or monsoon depression

The Atlantic hurricane reanalysis project began the track of this storm about 315 mi (505 km) east of Barbuda on August 21, the same day indicated by Ivan Ray Tannehill in 1938 and one day after professor E. B. Garriott described in 1900. On August 22, the cyclone began passing north of the Lesser Antilles, with Saint Thomas reporting sustained winds up to 60 mph (95 km/h) on the following day. Moving northwestward, the system intensified, reaching hurricane status early on August 24. The hurricane passed northeast of the Abaco Islands in the Bahamas two days later and strengthened into a Category 2 hurricane on the present-day Saffir–Simpson scale, peaking with maximum sustained winds of 105 mph (165 km/h), based on Augusta and Tybee Island in Georgia recording barometric pressures as low as 985 mbar (29.1 inHg) on August 27. Prior to a reassessment by the Atlantic hurricane reanalysis project in 2003, the cyclone was considered a major hurricane, (Note: A major hurricane is a storm that ranks as Category 3 or higher on the Saffir–Simpson scale.) although meteorologists José Fernández-Partagás and Henry F. Diaz expressed skepticism in 1996 about the storm's status as a major hurricane due to sparse observations.

Weather map of the storm over Mississippi on August 29

After moving north-northwestward late on August 26 and early the next day, the storm then turned west-northwestward. Around 02:00 UTC on August 28, the hurricane made landfall in Georgia around Ossabaw Island, between St. Simons Island and Savannah, likely at the same intensity. Upon the cyclone moving ashore, National Weather Service meteorologist Al Sandrik calculated in 1999 that it possessed a minimum barometric pressure of 970 mbar (29 inHg), based on readings of 985 mbar (29.1 inHg) not near the center and a maximum wind radius of 17 mi (27 km). Fernández-Partagás and Diaz had previously noted due to Tybee Island recording sustained winds in excess of 60 mph (95 km/h) for a relatively short amount of time, hurricane-force winds were likely limited to a rather small area. Thereafter, the storm briefly moved westward and quickly weakened to a tropical storm within 10 hours of moving inland. By early on August 29, the system turned northwestward and weakened to a tropical depression later that day before dissipating over northwestern Mississippi near the Arkansas state line.

Climate scientist Michael Chenoweth's study, published in 2014, proposed a more consistent northwestward movement of this storm, leading to a landfall around Hilton Head Island, South Carolina, instead of in Georgia. He also argued that the cyclone persisted longer inland, dissipating over Missouri on August 30.

== Impact ==
Deadliest United States hurricanes
Rank	Hurricane	Season	Fatalities
1	4 "Galveston"	1900	8,000–12,000
2	4 "San Ciriaco"	1899	3,400
3	5 Maria	2017	2,982
4	5 "Okeechobee"	1928	2,823
5	4 "Cheniere Caminada"	1893	2,000
6	5 Katrina	2005	1,392
7	3 "Sea Islands"	1893	1,000–2,000
8	3 "Indianola"	1875	771
9	4 "Florida Keys"	1919	745
10	2 "Georgia"	1881	700
Reference: NOAA, GWU (Note: The storm category color indicates the intensity of the hurricane when landfalling in the U.S.)

Early in its known duration, the cyclone passed just north of the Lesser Antilles. Several islands observed light winds and rainfall, including 2.95 in (75 mm) of rain over the course of two days at Basseterre, Saint Kitts. Rough seas grounded three ships, destroying two, on Saint Thomas and grounded another on Guadeloupe. Between August 26 and August 27, the ship Sandusky encountered the storm, with the loss of all but two people, while most of the crew of the Hannah M. Lallis also drowned. In the United States, cautionary signals were raised from Cedar Key and Jacksonville in Florida to Sandy Hook, New Jersey.

Landfall coincided with high tide and proved very destructive, as several barrier islands were completely submerged by storm surge. In Savannah, Georgia, few structures escaped damage, with the Monthly Weather Review noting that "nearly every house received a copious supply of salt water." in the Bohanville section of the city. Among the buildings damaged were the City Exchange, the Signal Corps office (the predecessor of the National Weather Service), and the Savannah Morning News. A number of streets were blocked, especially by large trees and the remnants of tin roofs. Property damage in the city reached about $1.5 million. Approximately 100 ships capsized in the vicinity of Savannah. Additionally, the turpentine and naval store industry suffered significant losses. A barometer recorded a pressure of 984.76 mbar (29.08 inHg), while a wind speed of 80 mph (130 km/h) was observed before the anemometer was destroyed. At least 335 people died in Savannah alone. The Monthly Weather Review noted that in comparison, "the memorable storm of 1851 was not as violent or prolonged."

Tybee Island, Georgia, was also among the localities severely impacted. There, the storm demolished rows of cottages and even some of the sturdiest homes. Three people died after a house collapsed and caught fire, while five people drowned after their house was swept away. Georgia Southern University history professor and author Walter J. Fraser Jr. argued that the hurricane slowed the island's development into a seaside resort. On nearby Cockspur Island, the cyclone "dealt the final blow to the aging Workers’ Village and destroyed the lightkeeper’s house and the ordnance sergeant’s house," according to the National Park Service. The entire island was inundated, including the interior of Fort Pulaski having up to 5 ft (1.5 m) of water inside, where all of the island's residents sought refuge. Cockspur Island's ditch and dike system also suffered major damage. Firsthand accounts south of the Savannah area reported that at Brunswick, the storm downed some wires and damaged lumber lying near a river. In Darien, the hurricane deroofed some buildings and toppled a church. Strong winds at Harris Neck demolished 15 homes, killing 4 people and leaving 6 others with injuries. One lasting impact of the storm in coastal Georgia was that it eventually led to the collapse of the local rice industry, partly also caused by increasing competition from Arkansas and Louisiana.

Additionally, South Carolina experienced extensive coastal flooding. On Daufuskie Island, rough seas carried away a boat, several huts, and the wharf. Twenty to forty people drowned in Port Royal after high tides swept away the ferry house. Nearby, Beaufort experienced prostrated buildings, fences, and trees, as well as the destruction of all wharves. On Edingsville Island, a correspondent reported that "the existence of Edingsville as a village has now ended... nothing remains to remind us of its former glory except a few dilapidated houses." Nearby, the storm destroyed approximately two-thirds of rice cotton crops on Edisto Island. In Charleston, several feet of water submerged areas east of East Bay Street and inundated many properties in the southwest sections of the city. Substantial damage to businesses, fences, roofs, telegraph wires, and trees was also reported. Damage in the city ranged from $200,000 to $300,000. The hurricane destroyed four residences, severely damaged fifteen others, and washed away a significant amount of sand at Sullivan's Island, with damage estimated at $25,000. A correspondent in Dorchester County, South Carolina, noted the destruction of nearly every church and fence, and corn, cotton, and rice crops throughout the county. The storm also damaged a number of homes, blocked highways in numerous places, and killed six people. Along Rautowles Creek and the Ashepoo, Cooper (eastern and western branches), Combahee, and Edisto rivers, 44 rice plantations were mostly or entirely submerged with salt water, while 3 others reported only minor damage. North of the Charleston area, storm surge and tides moved across Pawleys Island, sweeping away all bridges to the mainland. Additionally, salt water intruded the Pee Dee and Waccamaw rivers as far as 20 mi (30 km) of the coast and damaged rice crops along those waterways.

Gale-force winds extended into North Carolina, including at Montgomery, uprooting trees and deroofing several homes there. The coastal town also experienced tides approximately 6 ft (1.8 m) above the mean high water mark, dragging away several larger structures. High tides also swept parts of Masonboro, Oak Island, Smithville (now known as Southport), and Wrightsville Beach, with some bathhouses and gangways carried away at Smithville. Winds uprooted and damaged trees in Wilmington. In Alabama, heavy rains in Troy flooded some sidewalks and caved in a sewer, while damage was also reported at Montgomery. Overall, the storm caused an estimated 700 fatalities, making the hurricane among the deadliest to strike the United States.

== See also ==
- List of Georgia hurricanes
- List of South Carolina hurricanes
