= 1885 Atlantic hurricane season =

Series of hurricanes throughout 1885

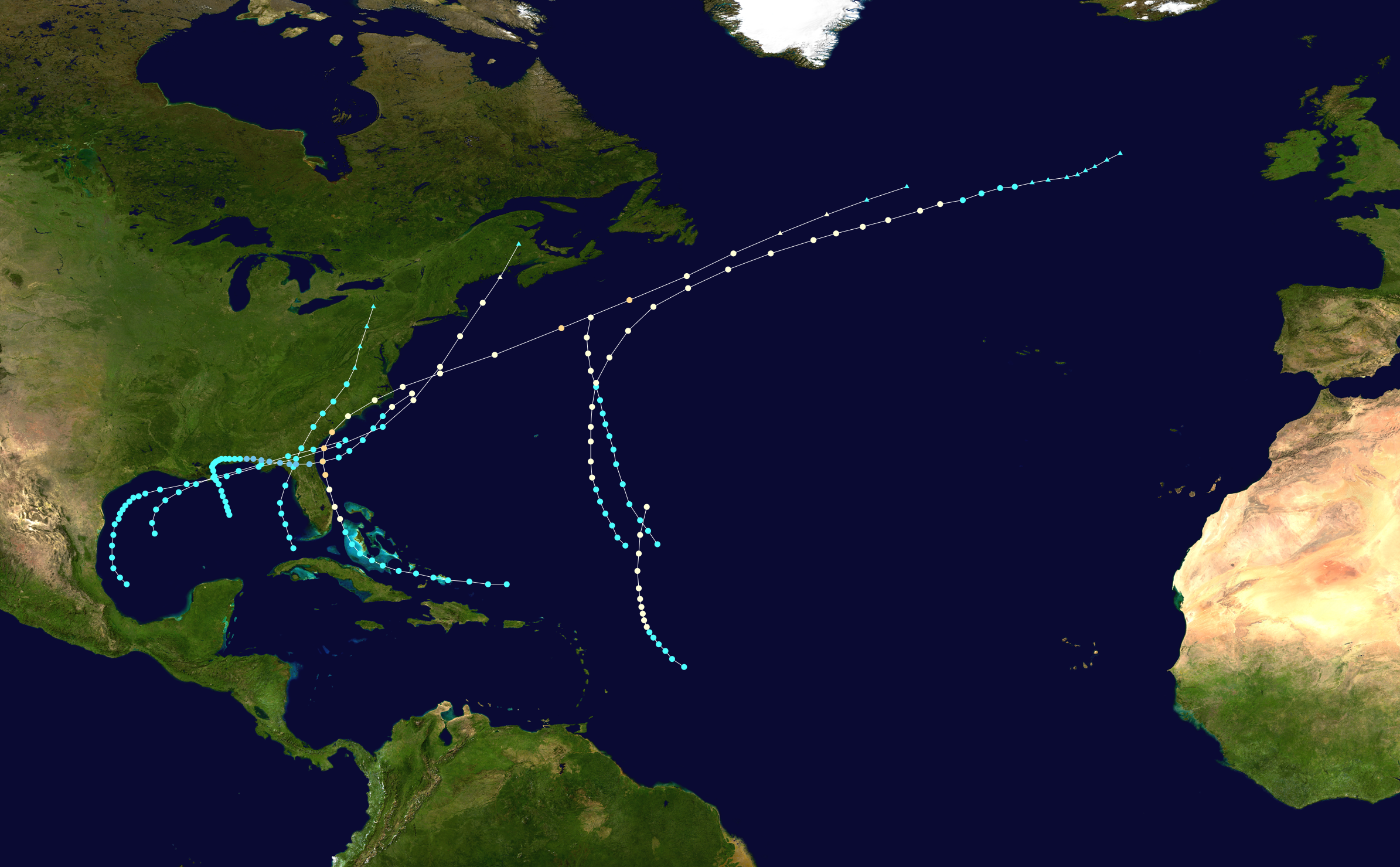
- Season summary map

Seasonal boundaries
- First system formed: August 7, 1885
- Last system dissipated: October 13, 1885

Strongest storm
- Name: Two
  - Maximum winds: 105 mph (165 km/h) (1-minute sustained)
  - Lowest pressure: 953 mbar (hPa; 28.14 inHg)

Seasonal statistics
- Total storms: 8
- Hurricanes: 6
- Major hurricanes (Cat. 3+): 0
- Total fatalities: 29
- Total damage: $1.806 million (1885 USD)

The 1885 Atlantic hurricane season produced eight tropical cyclones, fifth of which made landfall in the United States. Overall, the season featured two tropical storms and six hurricanes in the Atlantic basin, none of which intensified into a major hurricane. (Note: A major hurricane is a storm that ranks as Category 3 or higher on the Saffir–Simpson hurricane wind scale.) However, in the absence of modern satellite monitoring and remote-sensing technologies, only storms that affected populated land areas or encountered ships at sea were recorded, so the actual total could be higher. An undercount bias of zero to six tropical cyclones per year between 1851 and 1885 and zero to four per year between 1886 and 1910 has been estimated.

Reanalysis by meteorologists José Fernández-Partagás and Henry F. Diaz in 1996 and the Atlantic hurricane reanalysis project in the early 21st century did not add or remove any systems from the official hurricane database (HURDAT). However, both modified the tracks of some tropical cyclones. More recently, climate researcher Michael Chenoweth authored a reanalysis study, published in 2014, which concluded that the 1885 season featured a total of ten tropical cyclones. This included the removal of the sixth system and the addition of three previously undocumented storms, for a net gain of two cyclones. Chenoweth also proposed some alterations to the track and intensity of each storm, but these changes have yet to be incorporated into HURDAT.

On August 7, the season's first system was initially detected to the southeast of Bermuda. Intensifying into a hurricane, the system transitioned into an extratropical cyclone far north of the Azores on August 13. The season's most intense cyclone, the second system, peaked as a Category 2 hurricane on the present-day Saffir–Simpson scale. Striking South Carolina on August 15, the storm caused 25 fatalities and more than $1.806 million (1885 USD) in damage. (Note: All damage figures are in 1885 USD, unless otherwise noted) Most of the other six cyclones impacted land, including the fourth system, which killed four people beaching a coal barge in Texas. The eighth and final storm produced damage from Florida to Virginia due to strong winds, heavy rains, and rough seas, before becoming extratropical over the latter on October 13.

== Season summary ==
The Atlantic hurricane database (HURDAT) recognizes eight tropical cyclones for 1885 in the Atlantic basin; two were tropical storms and six were hurricanes, but none of these strengthened into a major hurricane. Five of the systems made landfall in the United States. José Fernández-Partagás and Henry F. Diaz did not add or remove any cyclones from their 1996 reanalysis, but modified the tracks of first, second, and eighth storms. Furthermore, the Atlantic hurricane reanalysis project in the early 21st century neither adjusted the number of cyclones nor significantly revised the information uncovered by Fernández-Partagás and Diaz. A reanalysis by climate researcher Michael Chenoweth, published in 2014, adds three storms and removes one, the sixth system. Chenoweth's study utilizes a more extensive collection of newspapers and ship logs. Additionally, the study also incorporates late 19th century weather maps, unlike previous reanalysis projects. However, Chenoweth's proposals have yet to be incorporated into HURDAT.

The first cyclone was initially detected on August 7 to the southeast of Bermuda. Intensifying into a hurricane, the system transitioned into an extratropical cyclone far north of the Azores on August 13. Two other storms formed in August, including the season's second, which became the most intense in the basin that year, peaking as a Category 2 hurricane with maximum sustained winds of 105 mph (165 km/h) and a minimum atmospheric pressure of 953 mbar (28.1 inHg). Striking South Carolina on August 15, the storm led to 25 fatalities and more than $1.806 million in damage, before re-entering the Atlantic and becoming extratropical on August 27 east of Newfoundland. September featured four cyclones, all of which peaked as a Category 1 hurricane. The first of the four, the season's fourth system, killed four people after beaching a coal barge along the coast of Texas, while the sixth cyclone caused flooding in New Orleans, Louisiana, and in Florida at Jacksonville and Pensacola. In October, the eighth and final known storm of the season produced damage from Florida to Virginia due to strong winds, heavy rains, and rough seas. The system transitioned into an extratropical cyclone on October 13 over Virginia.

The season's activity was reflected with an accumulated cyclone energy (ACE) rating of 58, the lowest total since 1876. ACE is a metric used to express the energy used by a tropical cyclone during its lifetime. Therefore, a storm with a longer duration will have higher values of ACE. It is only calculated at six-hour increments in which specific tropical and subtropical systems are either at or above sustained wind speeds of 39 mph (63 km/h), which is the threshold for tropical storm intensity. Thus, tropical depressions are not included in the metric.

== Systems ==
=== Hurricane One ===
- Category 1 hurricane (SSHWS)
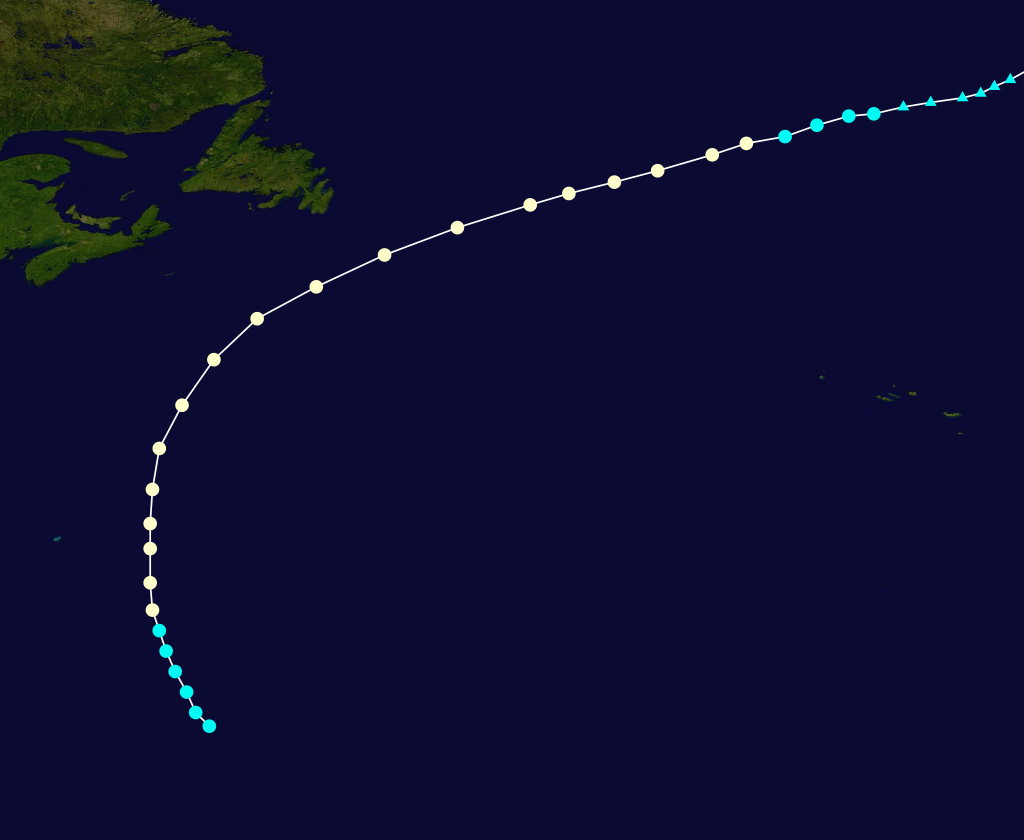
- Duration: August 7 – August 13
- Peak intensity: 90 mph (150 km/h) (1-min); ≤975 mbar (hPa)

A brig known as Lilian first encountered this storm to the southeast of Bermuda on August 7. Consequently, the Atlantic hurricane database begins the track on that date about 500 mi (805 km) northeast of the Leeward Islands. Initially a tropical storm, it moved north-northeastward and strengthened into a hurricane on August 8, based on ships recording barometric pressures around 990 mbar (29 inHg). The system turned to the northeast by August 10, passing to the south of Newfoundland and likely peaking with maximum sustained winds of 90 mph (150 km/h), as the bark King County observed barometric pressures as low as 975 mbar (28.8 inHg). The hurricane weakened over the north Atlantic Ocean, falling to tropical storm intensity on August 13 and becoming extratropical on the following day. Climate researcher Michael Chenoweth's 2014 study argued that this system developed on July 30 to the south of the Cabo Verde Islands as a tropical depression. Additionally, the storm reached hurricane status about 30 hours earlier than HURDAT indicates.

=== Hurricane Two ===
- Category 2 hurricane (SSHWS)
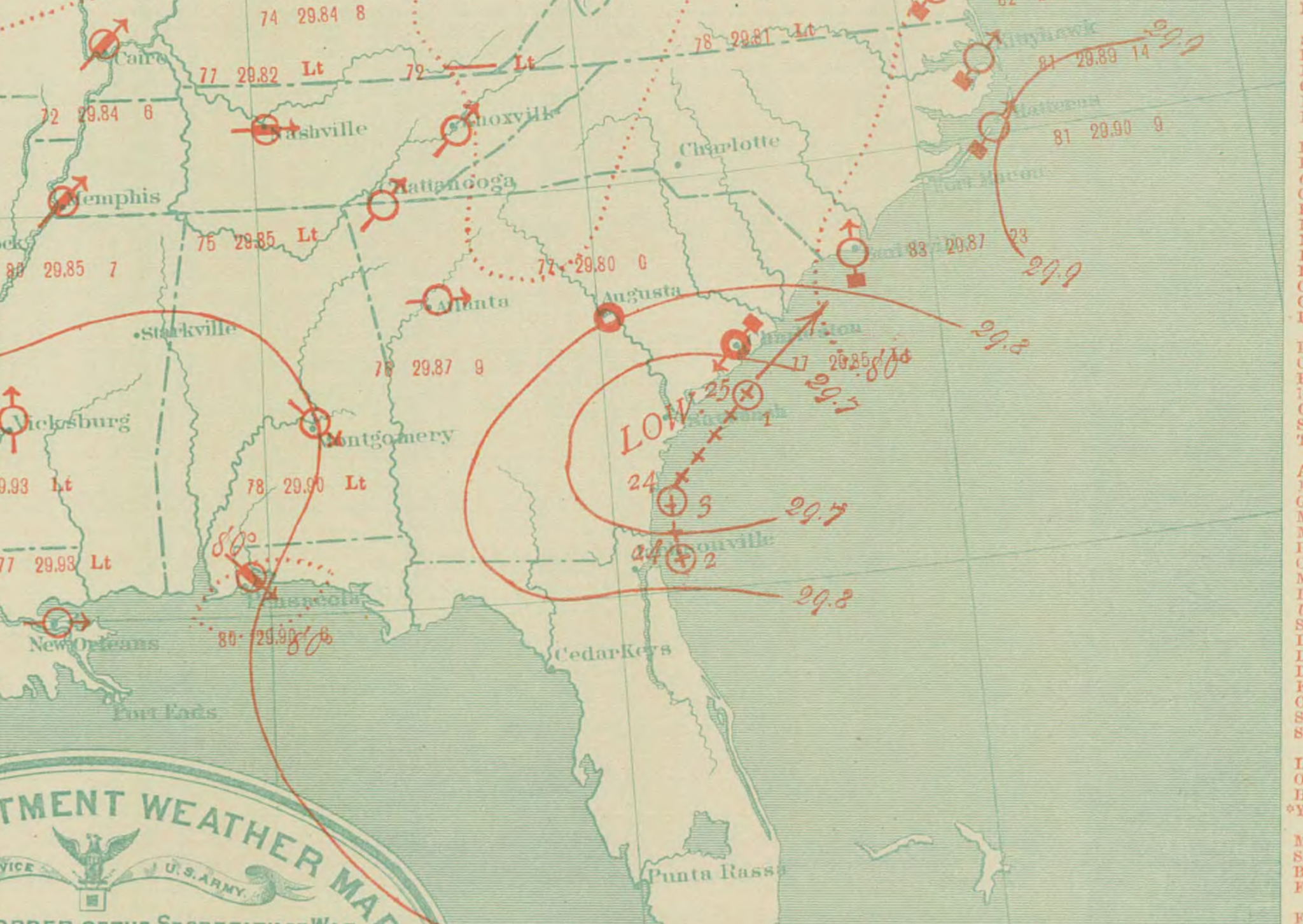
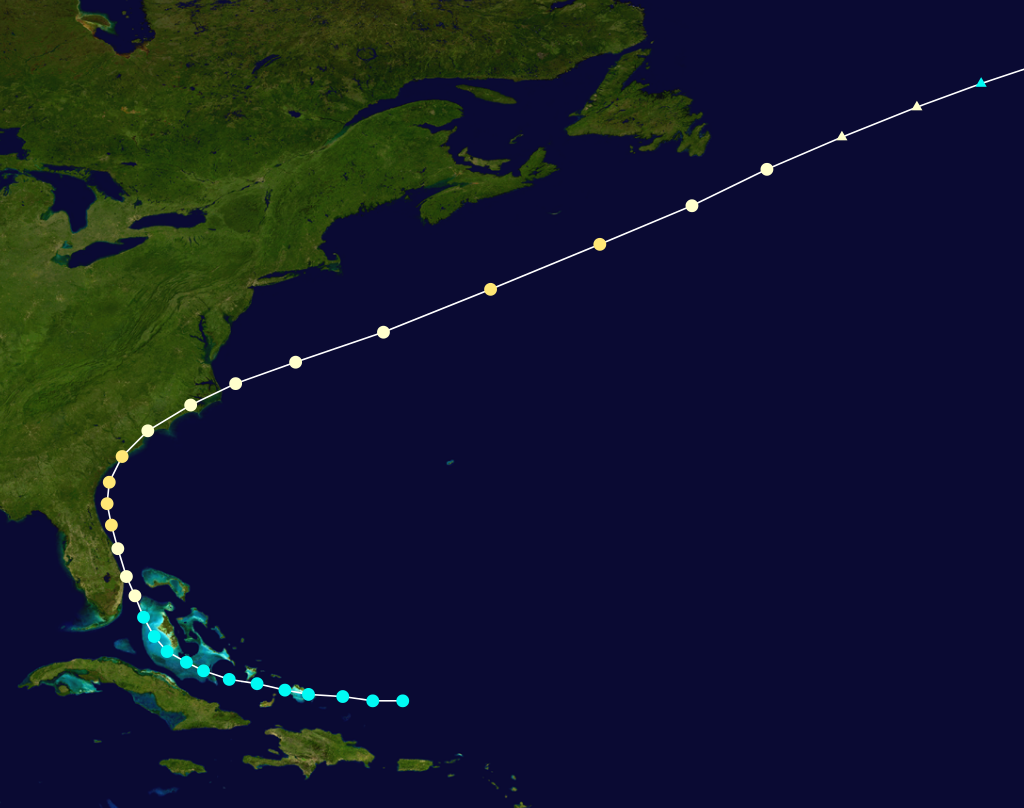
- Duration: August 21 – August 27
- Peak intensity: 105 mph (165 km/h) (1-min); ≤953 mbar (hPa)

Although observations prior to August 23 could not be located, HURDAT begins the track of this storm approximately 185 mi (300 km) north of Puerto Rico on August 21, based on a 1993 reanalysis led by C. J. Neumann. The tropical storm moved generally westward and crossed the southern Bahamas, until curving north-northwestward while passing just west of Andros between August 22 and August 23. After intensifying into a hurricane early on August 24, the cyclone passed very close to Florida, including just over 10 mi (15 km) east of Jupiter Island at 06:00 UTC. The storm then curved northeastward early the next day, hours prior to making landfall on Kiawah Island, South Carolina. Based on a pressure observation of 974 mbar (28.8 inHg), the cyclone was likely a Category 2 hurricane with winds of 105 mph (165 km/h). The hurricane passed across North Carolina just west of Wilmington and Hatteras, near where it re-emerged into the Atlantic early on August 26. Although the storm weakened to a Category 1 hurricane, it re-intensified into a 105 mph (165 km/h) Category 2 hurricane, based on the bark Harold recording a barometric pressure of 958 mbar (28.3 inHg). Late on August 27, the system transitioned into an extratropical cyclone about 290 mi (470 km) east of Newfoundland, and continued northeastward until dissipating late the next day.

Chenoweth argued that this storm actually developed on August 22 and moved northwestward, mostly avoiding the Bahamas but passing close to the Abaco Islands. The study also suggested that the cyclone attained hurricane on August 24, but weakened to a Category 2 hurricane before making landfall in North Carolina. In Florida, abnormally high tides and "high winds pummeled the coast" according to Jay Barnes, with a sustained wind speed of 60 mph (95 km/h) and hurricane-force wind gusts in Jacksonville. Nearby, winds destroyed a hotel, while many buildings and boats suffered significant damage in Fernandina Beach. The storm disrupted attempts to settle present-day Cocoa Beach, with waves flooding many homesteads. Nearby, severe erosion occurred in the vicinity of the Cape Canaveral Lighthouse, prompting an effort to move the lighthouse about 1 mi (1.6 km) farther inland. Sustained winds in Georgia reached 56 mph (90 km/h) on Tybee Island. About $1.69 million in damage occurred in Charleston, South Carolina. In North Carolina, an anemometer at Smithville (modern-day Southport) measured a 5-minute sustained wind speed of 98 mph (158 km/h) before being destroyed. The storm caused considerable damage at Wilmington, Smithville, and Morehead City. The value of this damage was estimated at $100,000. Heavy rain and flooding were also seen across Maryland. At Ellicott City, lightning set fire to a residence, causing about $16,000 in damage. In total, the hurricane caused 25 deaths, with 21 of those occurring in South Carolina.

=== Tropical Storm Three ===
- Tropical storm (SSHWS)
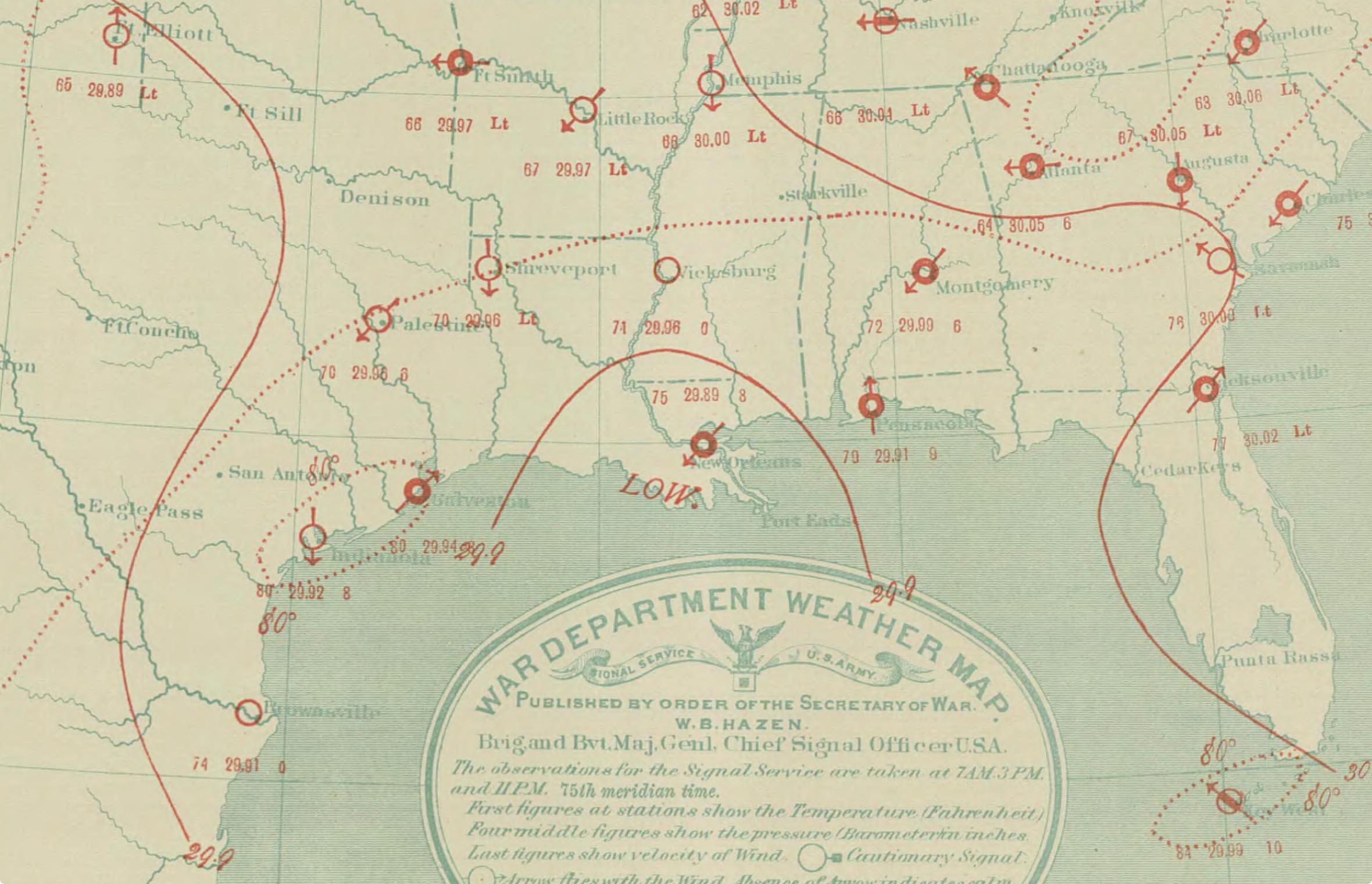
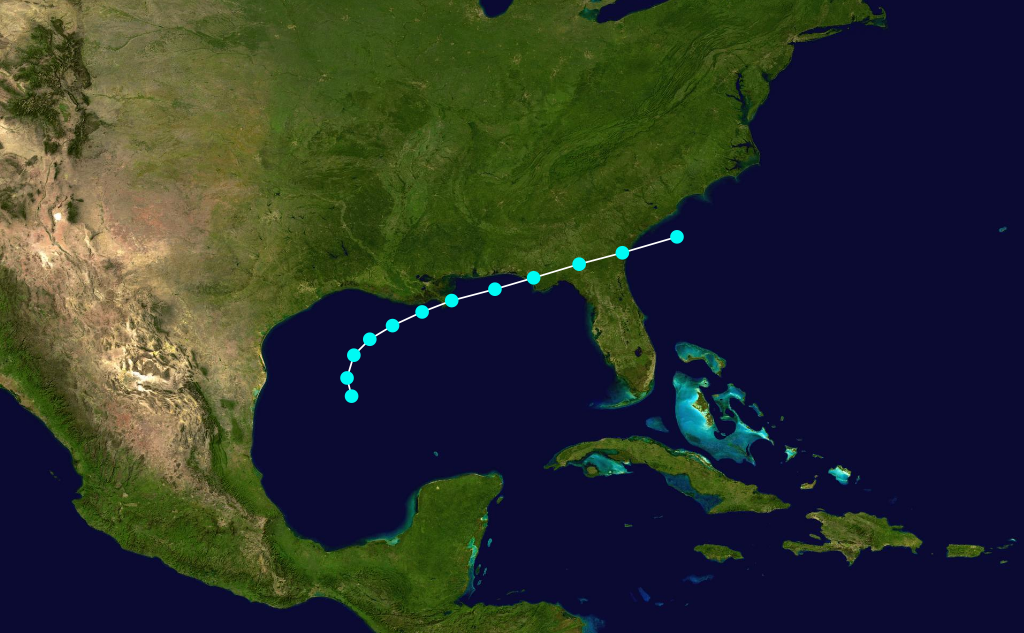
- Duration: August 29 – August 31
- Peak intensity: 60 mph (95 km/h) (1-min);

The Monthly Weather Review noted that this cyclone was first observed over the western Gulf of Mexico on August 29 but notes that "the center could not be definitely placed until the morning of Aug. 30". Nevertheless, the official track begins on the former date approximately 245 mi (394 km) east-southeast of the mouth of the Rio Grande. After initially moving northwestward, it moved quickly to the northeast and made landfall on extreme southeastern Louisiana shortly before 12:00 UTC on August 30 as a 60 mph (95 km/h) tropical storm. Approximately 11 hours later, the cyclone made another landfall near Panama City Beach, Florida. The cyclone emerged into the Atlantic near Brunswick, Georgia, on August 31 and was last noted later that day. Parts of the Gulf Coast and Southeastern United States regions experienced high winds and heavy rains, though the Monthly Weather Review that "the storm would have been thought quite severe if it had not been brought into such close contact with its predecessor." The 2014 study by Chenoweth argued that the cyclone did not strike Louisiana and dissipated over coastal South Carolina on August 31, rather than offshore.

=== Hurricane Four ===
- Category 1 hurricane (SSHWS)
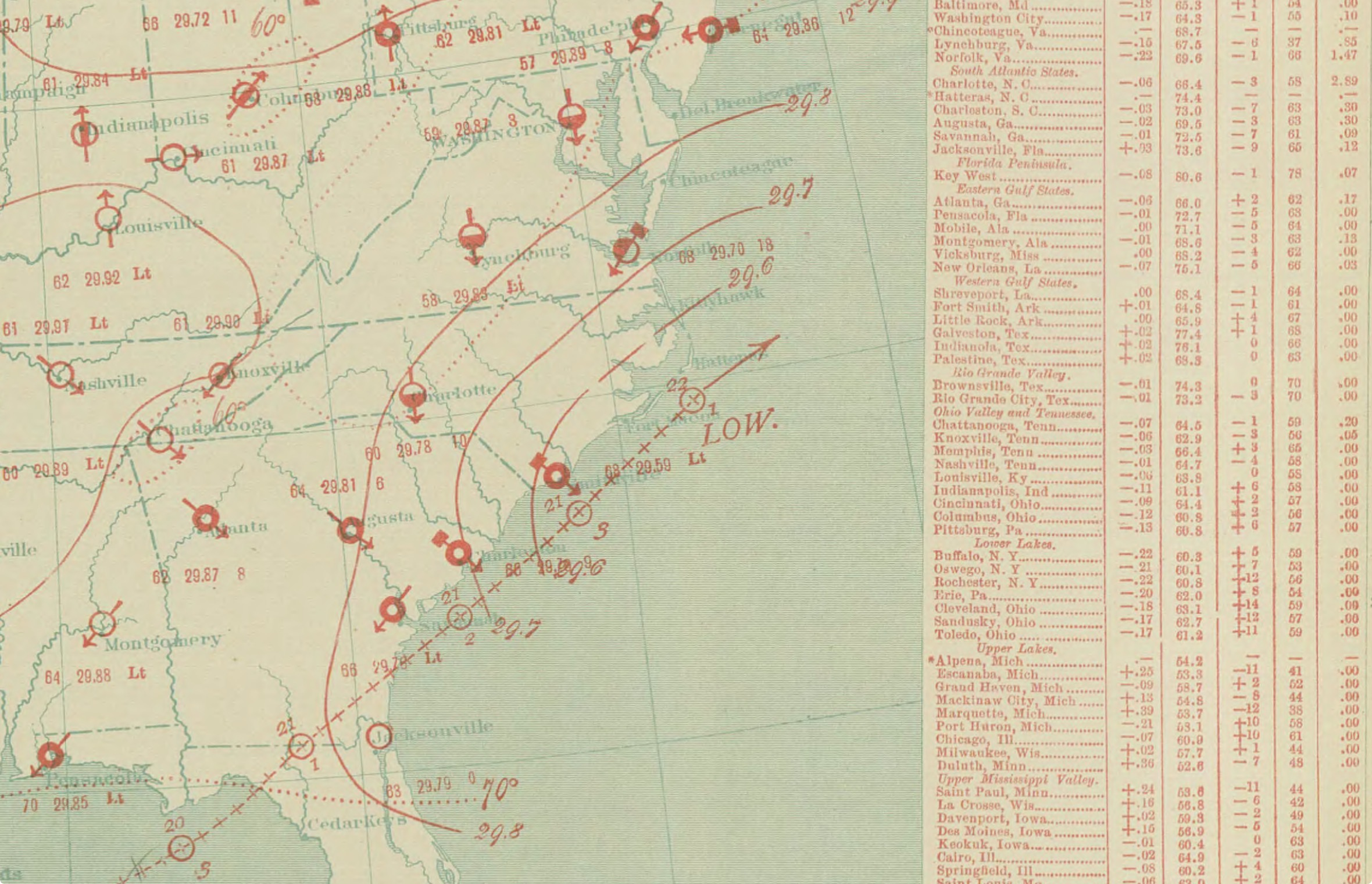
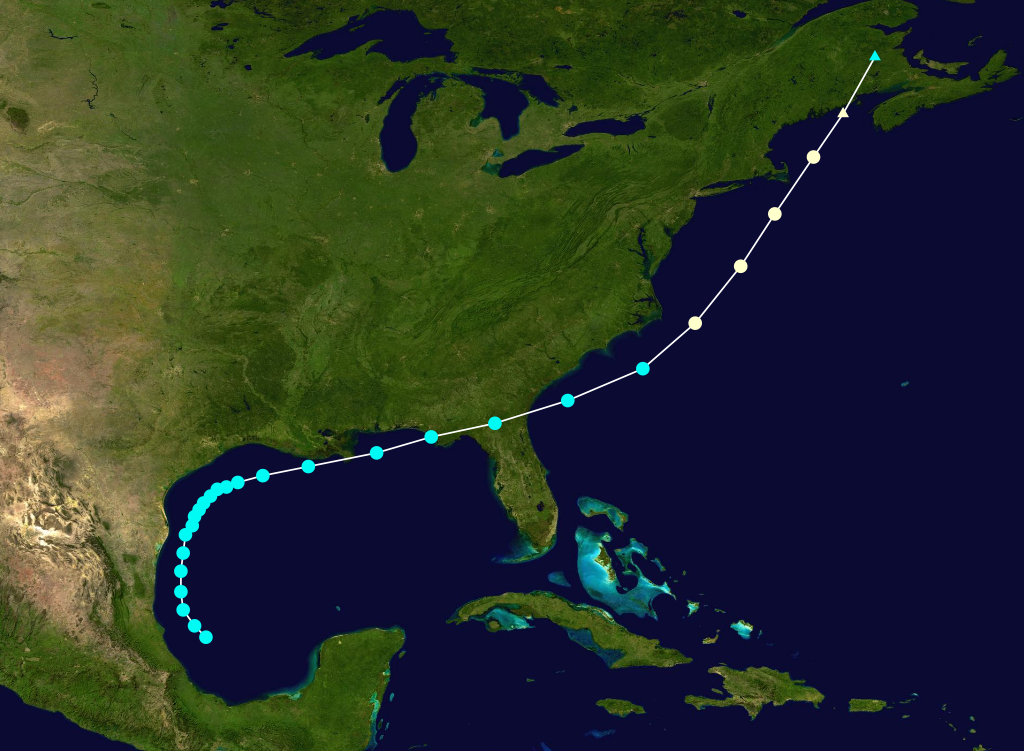
- Duration: September 17 – September 23
- Peak intensity: 90 mph (150 km/h) (1-min); 973 mbar (hPa)

With Galveston, Texas, experiencing abnormally high tides as early as September 17, the official track for this cyclone starts approximately 120 mi (195 km) east-northeast of Tuxpan, Veracruz. The storm moved parallel to the coasts of Mexico and Texas, turning northward that day and northeastward on September 19. By the following day, the cyclone accelerated east-northeastward. The system then made landfall near Port Eads, Louisiana, at 03:00 UTC on September 21 and then near Panama City Beach, Florida, about nine hours later, likely possessing sustained winds of 60 mph (95 km/h) at both locations. After emerging into the Atlantic near Kingsland, Georgia, late on September 21, the storm curved northeastward on the following day and intensified into a hurricane. Due to ships recording barometric pressures as low as 973 mbar (28.7 inHg), the system is estimated to have peaked with winds of 90 mph (150 km/h) on September 23. Later that day, however, the storm became extratropical just prior to making landfall in southeastern Maine.

Chenoweth's 2014 study concluded that this system struck neither Louisiana nor Florida, instead making landfall in Alabama and then turning eastward, dissipating over Georgia on September 30. As the storm moved parallel to Gulf of Mexico coastline, it flooded coastal towns, especially in Texas. Galveston observed more than 6 in (150 mm) of precipitation and coastal flooding. A coal barge Orient washed ashore, causing four deaths. The town of Indianola also experienced coastal flooding and sustained winds up to 45 mph (72 km/h). Several coastal cities of Gulf Coast and Southeastern United States regions reported heavy precipitation. The storm produced gales in Massachusetts, damaging many telegraph wires. Damage to vessels and shipping occurred along the coast of Nova Scotia, including in Halifax and Lunenburg. Additionally, the cyclone prostrated telegraph wires and destroyed many bridges.

=== Hurricane Five ===
- Category 1 hurricane (SSHWS)
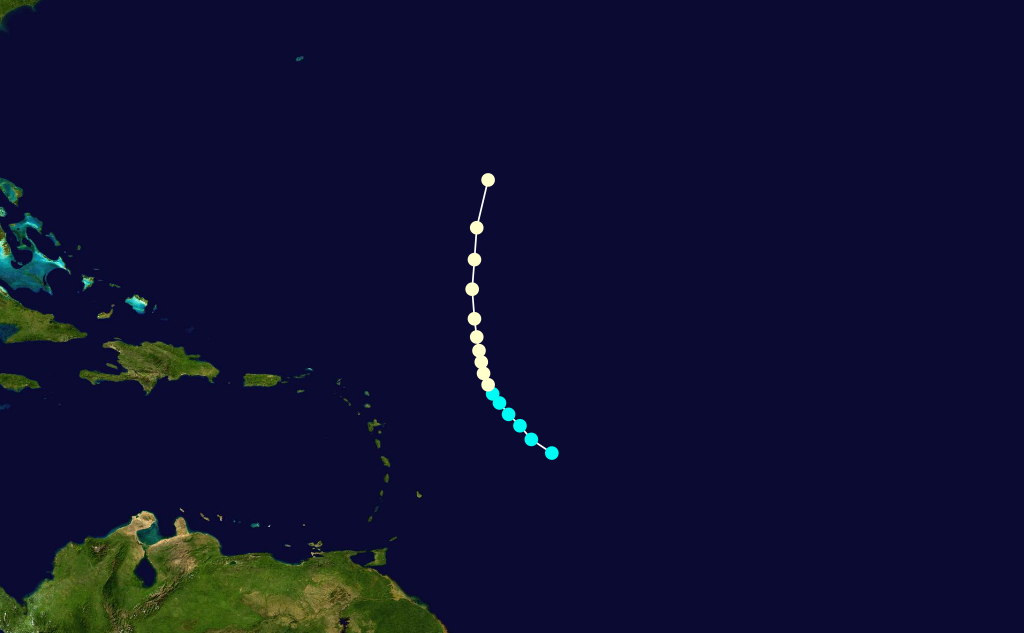
- Duration: September 18 – September 21
- Peak intensity: 80 mph (130 km/h) (1-min); ≤999 mbar (hPa)

The steamship Sirius recorded a barometric pressure of 999 mbar (29.5 inHg) in a storm east of the Leeward Islands on September 18, leading to the official track beginning about 400 mi (645 km) east-northeast of Barbados. Moving slowly northwestward, the tropical storm intensified into a hurricane on September 19 and peaked with winds of 80 mph (130 km/h), based on the Sirius reporting winds "blowing a hurricane", according to the Monthly Weather Review. Thereafter, the cyclone moved generally northward and was last noted on September 21 about 610 mi (980 km) southeast of Bermuda. Chenoweth's study indicated that this storm moved northwestward until September 23, when it began moving northeastward. After becoming extratropical offshore Massachusetts early that day, the remnants crossed Atlantic Canada before dissipating over Labrador on September 24.

=== Hurricane Six ===
- Category 1 hurricane (SSHWS)
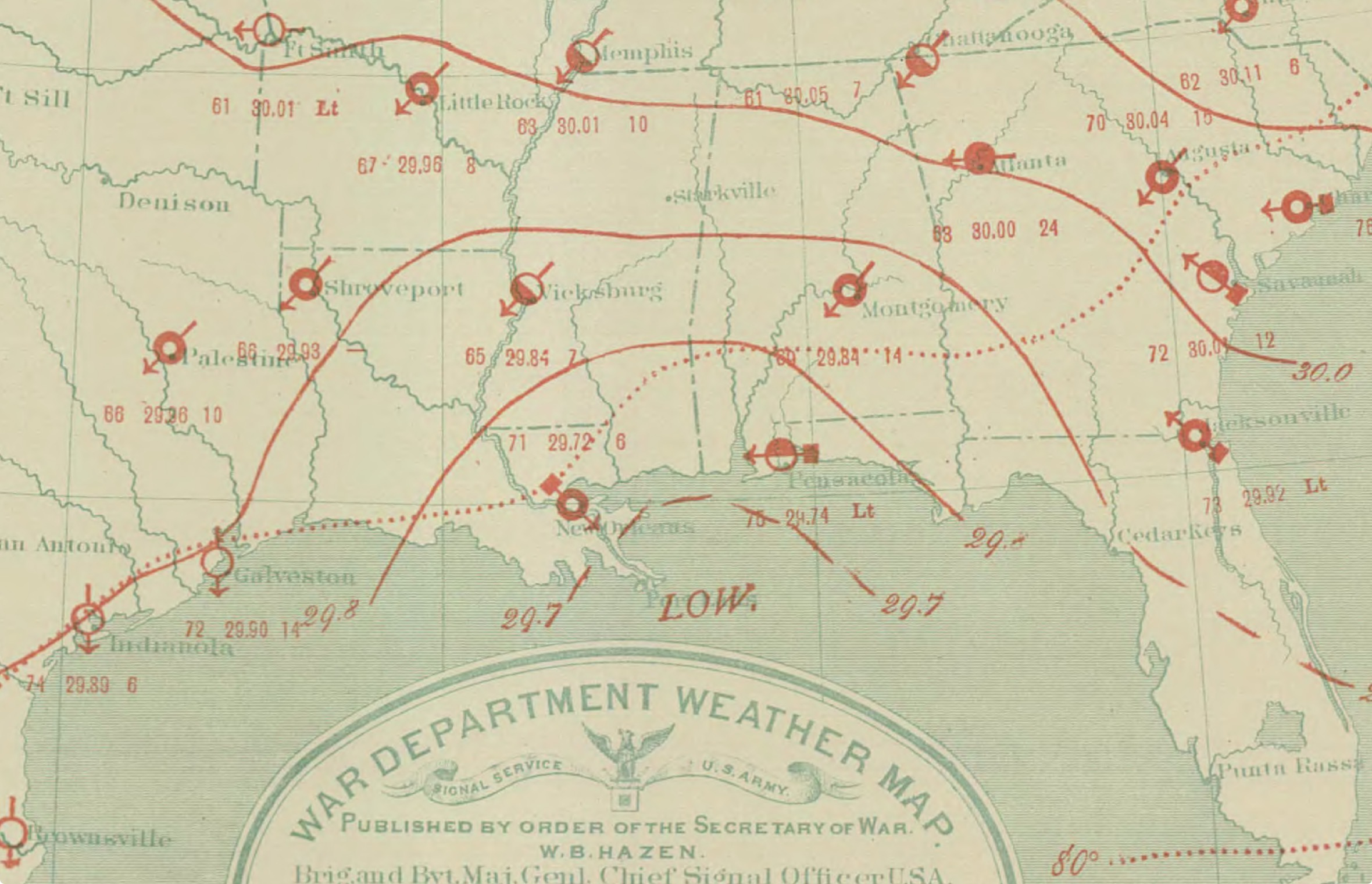
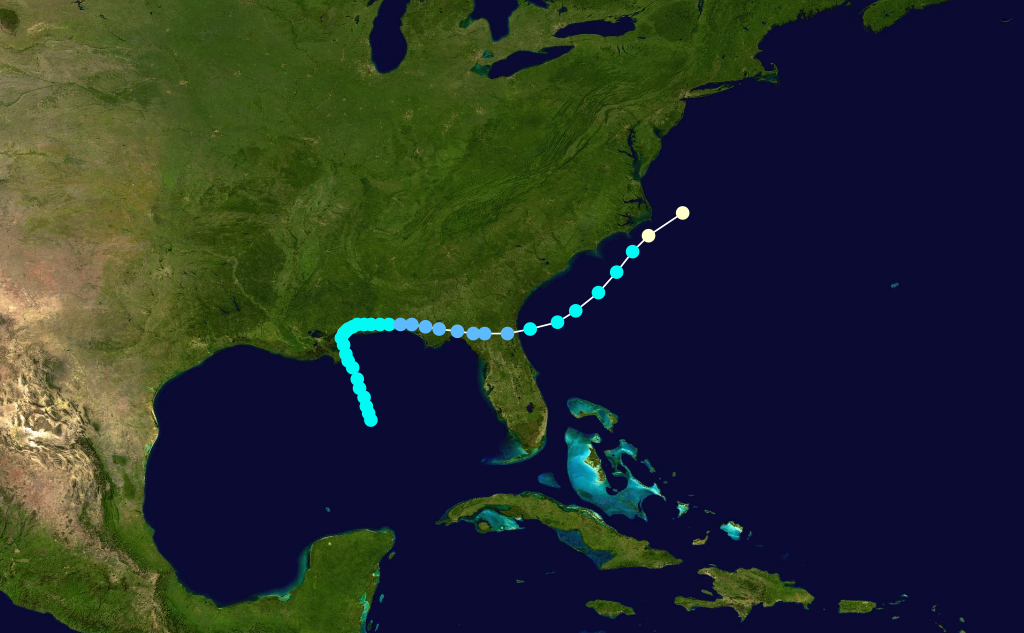
- Duration: September 24 – October 2
- Peak intensity: 80 mph (130 km/h) (1-min);

The Monthly Weather Review reported the existence of this storm beginning on September 24. Drifting north-northwestward, the cyclone struck Louisiana's Chandeleur Islands late on September 26 as a strong tropical storm. Early the next day, the system struck near Ocean Springs, Mississippi, and then turned eastward. Using a model created by meteorologists John Kaplan and Mark DeMaria, the storm is estimated to have weakened to a tropical depression over the Florida Panhandle on September 29. Early on October 1, the depression emerged into the Atlantic near Jacksonville and quickly re-intensified into a tropical storm as it turned northeastward. Observations from the ship Lone Star indicate that the storm strengthened into a hurricane on October 2, peaking with winds of 80 mph (130 km/h). However, the storm was last noted that day roughly 75 mi (120 km) east of Salvo, North Carolina.

Chenoweth's 2014 study argued that the Gulf of Mexico portion of the track of this storm should be deleted from HURDAT and the remaining path to be reclassified as extratropical. The storm dropped heavy rainfall over the Gulf Coast of the United States, especially between New Orleans, Louisiana, and Pensacola, Florida. Parts of the former flooded, while a section of the Louisville and Nashville Railroad was closed. Farther east, Jacksonville, Florida, recorded at least 13 in (330 mm) of precipitation during a 96-hour period. Consequently, floods occurred across the First Coast region, disrupting traffic along five out of six railroads and damaging numerous bridges, country roads, and docks, as well as some private property. Strong winds impacted the coasts of the Carolinas, including gusts of 70 mph (110 km/h) at Charleston, South Carolina.

=== Hurricane Seven ===
- Category 1 hurricane (SSHWS)
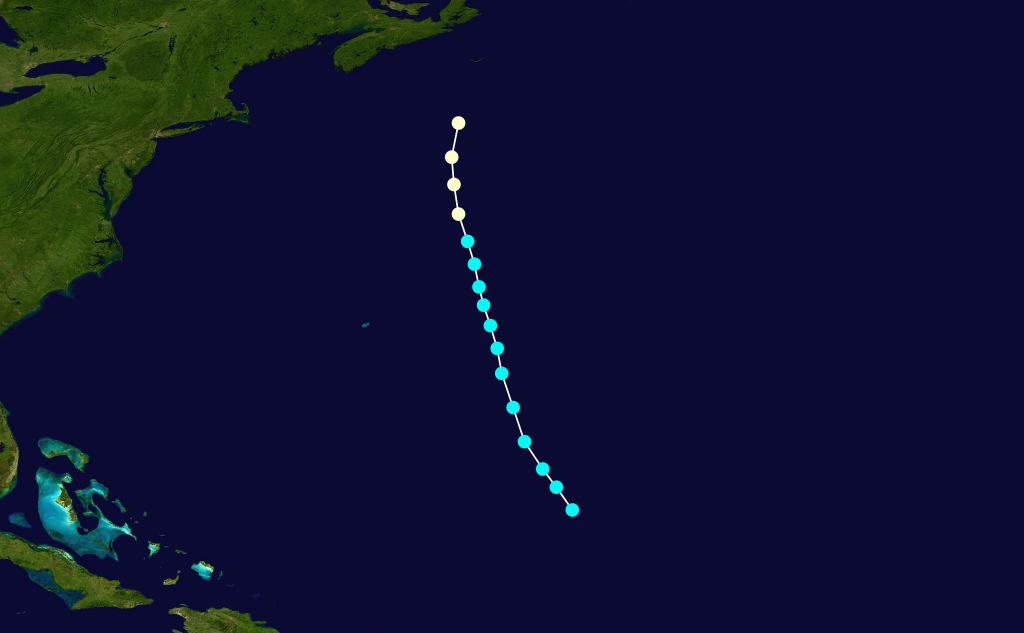
- Duration: September 26 – September 29
- Peak intensity: 90 mph (150 km/h) (1-min); 982 mbar (hPa)

Although no observations for this storm exist prior to September 28, the official track begins about 600 mi (965 km) northeast of the Leeward Islands, based on the 1993 reanalysis led by C. J. Neumann. Moving north-northwestward, the cyclone intensified into a hurricane by September 29 and peaked with maximum sustained winds of 90 mph (150 km/h) at 12:00 UTC, with the ship Mistletoe observing a barometric pressure of 982 mbar (29.0 inHg). However, the system was last noted later that day about 190 mi (305 km) south of Sable Island, Nova Scotia. Chenoweth's 2014 study theorized that the cyclone formed on September 23 but moved much slower. The storm also held hurricane status from September 26 to September 28, weakening instead of strengthening on September 29 and dissipating that day.

=== Tropical Storm Eight ===
- Tropical storm (SSHWS)
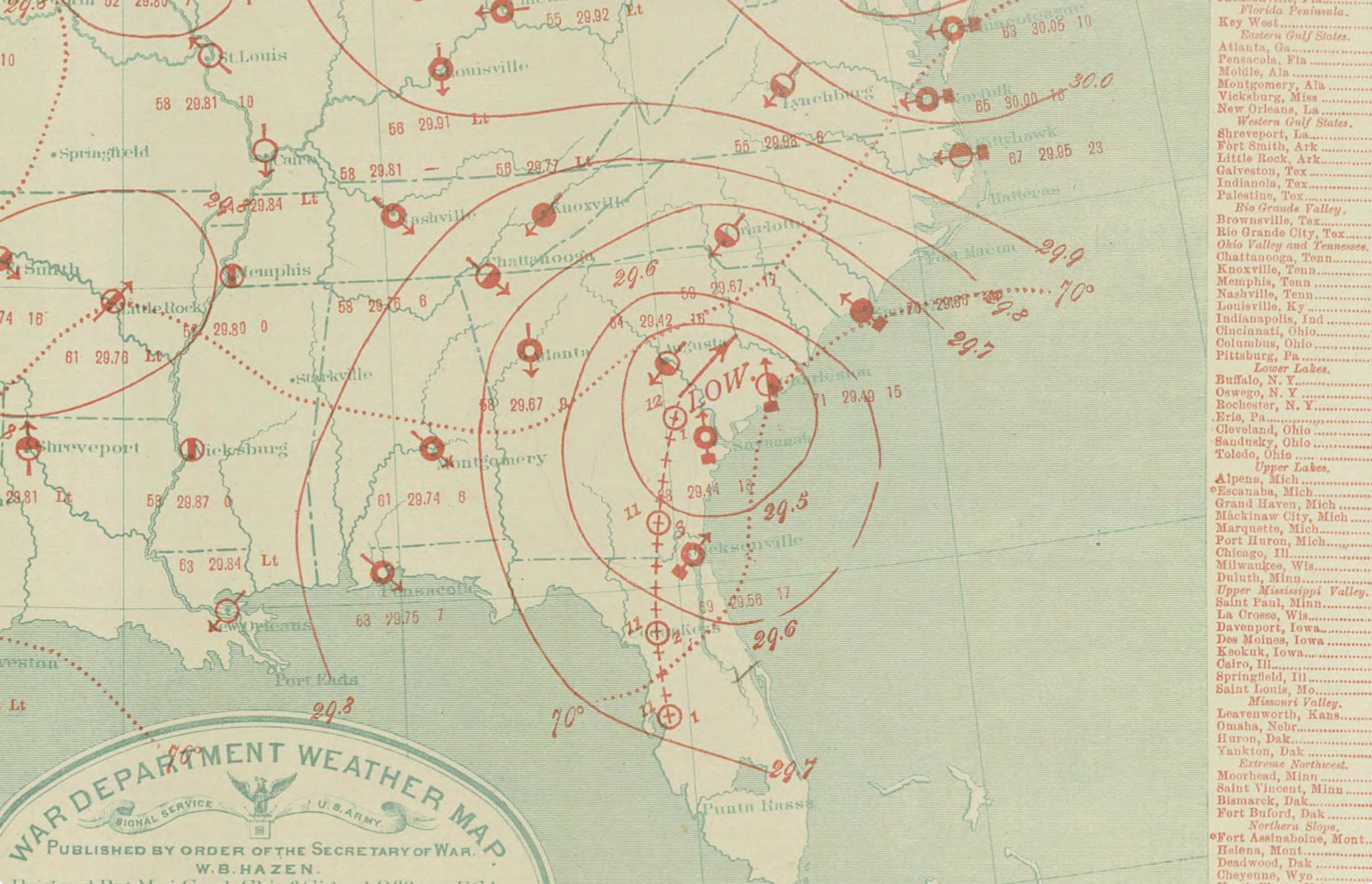
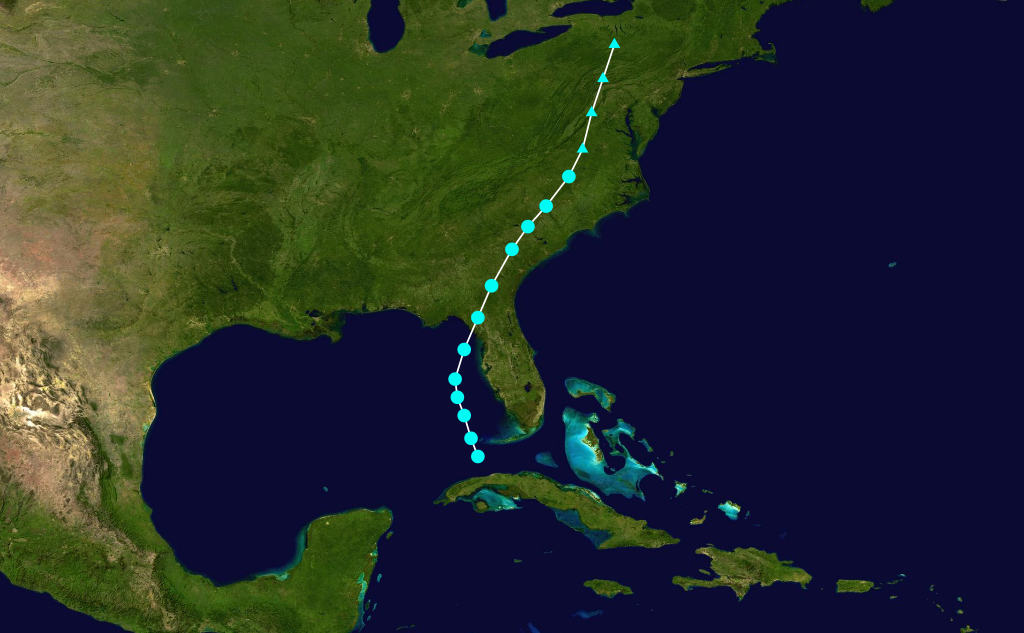
- Duration: October 10 – October 14
- Peak intensity: 70 mph (110 km/h) (1-min); 988 mbar (hPa)

Despite no record of this storm in Cuba, the Atlantic hurricane database initiated the track on October 10 in the far southeastern Gulf of Mexico, matching Neumann's 1993 reanalysis. After moving north-northwestward for about 24 hours, the cyclone turned northeastward on the following day and made landfall between Horseshoe Beach and Suwannee, Florida, around 22:00 UTC, with winds of 70 mph (110 km/h). Cedar Key recorded a barometric pressure of 988 mbar (29.2 inHg). By October 13, the storm transitioned into an extratropical over central Virginia and persisted until dissipating over western New York early the next day. The 2014 study by Chenoweth suggested that this cyclone instead developed north of the Yucatán Channel as a tropical depression and dissipated over northern Virginia.

In Florida, Cedar Key reported sustained winds of 48 mph (77 km/h). Abnormally high tides generated by these winds flooded wharves and roads. A washout occurred along a branch of the Savannah, Florida and Western Railway between Jacksonville, Florida, and Waycross, Georgia. Heavy rains over eastern Georgia caused the Savannah River to rise significantly at Savannah, damaging railroads in that part of the state. Gales of 44–56 mph (71–90 km/h) occurred along the North Carolina coast. High tides coincided with the storm's passage, inundating parts of New Bern and Smithville (present-day Southport), with floodwaters entering a few stores in the latter. The cyclone also wrecked a schooner at Hatteras Inlet. In Virginia, high winds damaged structures in Norfolk, especially unfinished buildings. Observers in Delaware, New Jersey, New York, and Connecticut also reported elevated winds and tides.

=== Other storms ===
Chenoweth proposed three other storms not currently listed in HURDAT. The first such system formed over the eastern Caribbean on October 7. Moving north-northwestward, the cyclone crossed the Virgin Islands as a tropical depression. On October 12, the system intensified into a tropical storm and turned eastward. Thereafter, the storm executed a cyclonic loop and then moved northeastward before dissipating on October 18. That same day, an extratropical cyclone transitioned into a tropical storm over the eastern Atlantic south of the Azores. For approximately nine days, the storm moved erratically and fluctuated between tropical storm and tropical depression status before dissipating on October 27. Chenoweth's third and final proposed cyclone developed on November 8 just east of the Windward Islands. Moving northwestward, the system turned north-northeastward on November 10, before dissipating that day.

== Season effects ==
This is a table of all of the known storms that have formed in the 1885 Atlantic hurricane season. It includes their duration, landfall, damages, and death totals. Deaths in parentheses are additional and indirect (an example of an indirect death would be a traffic accident), but were still related to that storm. Damage and deaths include totals while the storm was extratropical, a wave, or a low, and all of the damage figures are in 1885 USD.

1885 North Atlantic tropical cyclone season statistics
Storm name	Dates active	Storm category at peak intensity	Max 1-min wind mph (km/h)	Min. press. (mbar)	Areas affected	Damage (US$)	Deaths	Ref(s).
One	August 7–13	Category 1 hurricane	90 (150)	≤975	None	None	None	
Two	August 21–27	Category 2 hurricane	105 (165)	≤953	Bahamas, Southeastern United States (South Carolina)	>$1.806 million	25	
Three	August 29–31	Tropical storm	60 (95)	Unknown	Southeastern United States (Louisiana and Florida)	Unknown	None	
Four	September 17–23	Category 1 hurricane	90 (150)	973	Gulf Coast of Mexico, Gulf Coast of the United States (Louisiana and Florida), East Coast of the United States, Atlantic Canada	Unknown	4	
Five	September 18–21	Category 1 hurricane	80 (130)	≤999	None	None	None	
Six	September 24 – October 2	Category 1 hurricane	80 (130)	Unknown	Southeastern United States (Louisiana and Mississippi)	Unknown	None	
Seven	September 26–29	Category 1 hurricane	90 (150)	982	None	None	None	
Eight	October 10–13	Tropical storm	70 (110)	988	East Coast of the United States (Florida)	Unknown	None	
Season aggregates
8 systems	August 7 – October 13		105 (165)	≤953		>$1.806 million	29	

== See also ==
- Atlantic hurricane season
- Tropical cyclone observation
- Atlantic hurricane reanalysis project
