= 1942 Matagorda hurricane =

Category 3 Atlantic hurricane

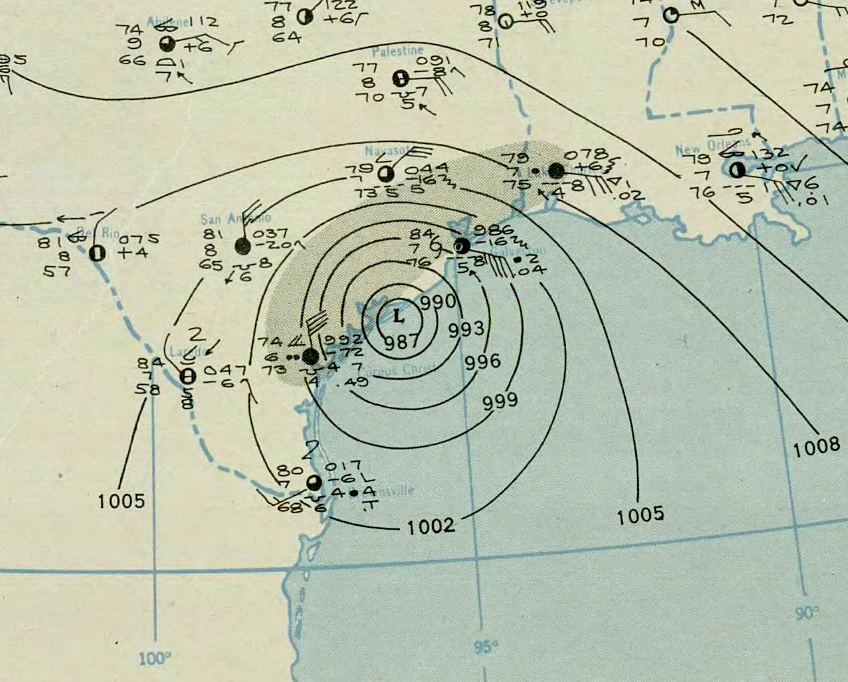
- Surface weather analysis on August 30, showing the hurricane nearing landfall in Texas at peak intensity

Meteorological history
- Formed: August 21, 1942
- Dissipated: August 31, 1942

Category 3 major hurricane
- 1-minute sustained (SSHWS/NWS)
- Highest winds: 115 mph (185 km/h)
- Lowest pressure: 950 mbar (hPa); 28.05 inHg

Overall effects
- Fatalities: 8
- Damage: $26.5 million (1942 USD)
- Areas affected: Mexico, Texas
- IBTrACS
- Part of the 1942 Atlantic hurricane season

The 1942 Matagorda hurricane was the most intense and costliest tropical cyclone of the 1942 Atlantic hurricane season. The second tropical storm and hurricane, as well as the first major hurricane of the year, (Note: A major hurricane is a storm that ranks as Category 3 or higher on the Saffir–Simpson hurricane scale.) it originated from a tropical wave near the island of St. Lucia on August 21. Moving generally westward across the Caribbean Sea, the storm remained weak for much of its early existence. However, it gradually intensified, and reached hurricane strength south of Jamaica on August 25 before coming ashore on the Yucatán Peninsula late on August 27. Once in the Gulf of Mexico, the hurricane quickly strengthened, and attained its peak intensity on August 29 as a Category 3 hurricane with winds of 115 mph (185 km/h). Nearing the Texas Gulf Coast, the storm maintained intensity, and continued to do so by the time it made a final landfall near Matagorda on August 30. Continuing inland, the hurricane weakened, and dissipated into a remnant low on August 31.

At the hurricane's first landfall near the northeastern tip of the Yucatán Peninsula, little information was documented on the storm's impacts. However, as the storm approached the Texas coast, widespread evacuations took place, including the evacuation of roughly 50,000 people from Galveston, Texas alone. Upon making landfall, the hurricane caused extensive damage in coastal regions. In Matagorda, a storm surge peaking at 14.7 ft (4.5 m) inundated the city and damaged many others. Strong winds from the storm wreaked havoc as far inland as San Antonio, Texas. The winds leveled numerous buildings and uprooted trees, in addition to causing widespread power outages. Crops in the areas affected saw large losses, particularly the rice crop. Rainfall associated with the storm was relatively light, due to the hurricane's rapid forward motion once inland, peaking at 9.3 in (0.24 m) in Woodsboro, Texas. Overall, the storm caused $26.5 million in damages and eight deaths. (Note: All damage totals are in 1942 United States dollars unless otherwise noted.)

== Meteorological history ==
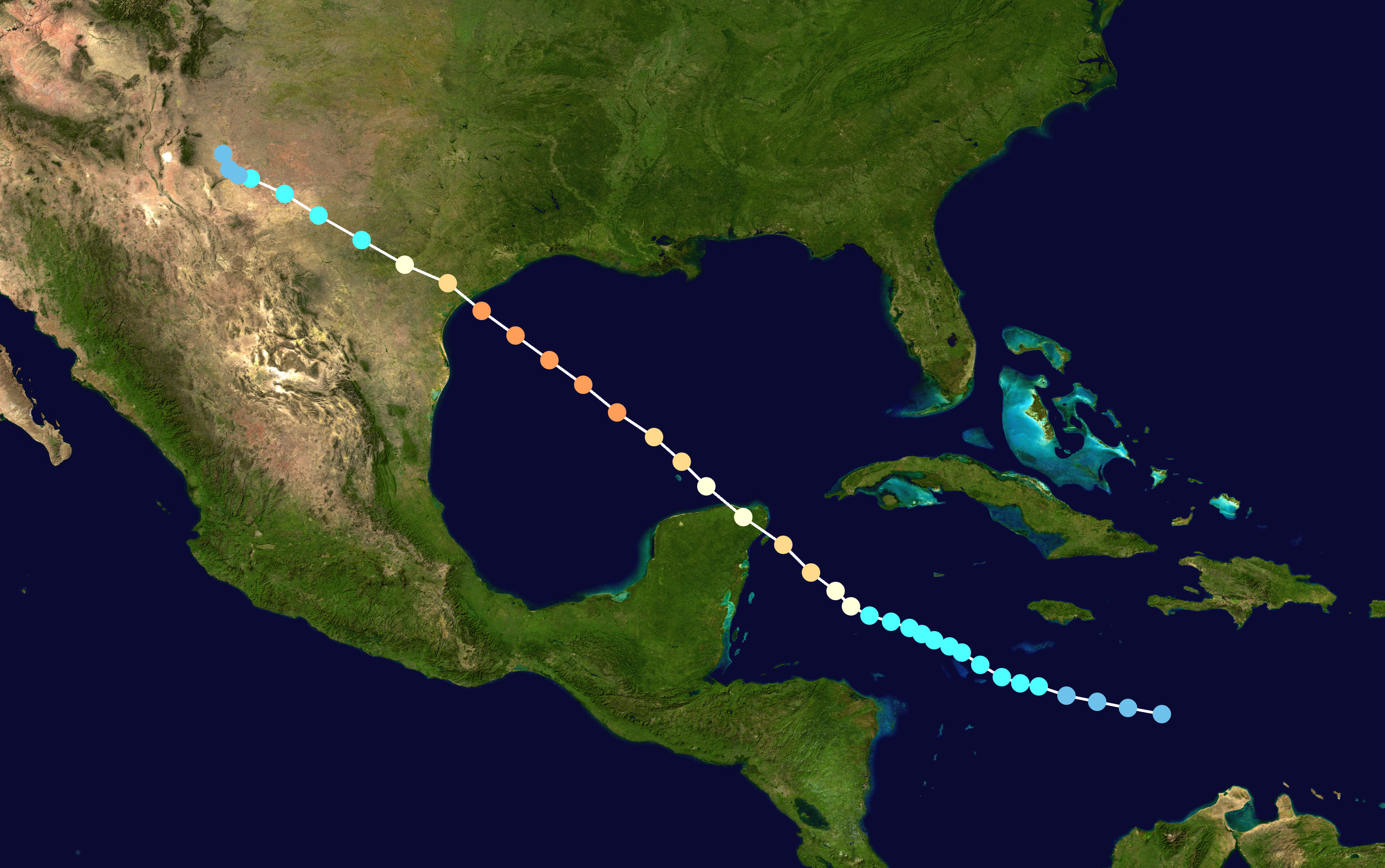
Map plotting the storm's track and intensity, according to the Saffir–Simpson scale Map key Saffir–Simpson scale Tropical depression (≤38 mph, ≤62 km/h) Tropical storm (39–73 mph, 63–118 km/h) Category 1 (74–95 mph, 119–153 km/h) Category 2 (96–110 mph, 154–177 km/h) Category 3 (111–129 mph, 178–208 km/h) Category 4 (130–156 mph, 209–251 km/h) Category 5 (≥157 mph, ≥252 km/h) Unknown Storm type Tropical cyclone Subtropical cyclone Extratropical cyclone, remnant low, tropical disturbance, or monsoon depression

A tropical wave was first noted near St. Lucia at 0600 UTC on August 21, associated with squally weather, though there were little signs of any organization. However, in HURDAT–the official database of positions and intensities of Atlantic hurricanes dating back to 1851–the system is listed to have already organized into a tropical storm at the same time. Nonetheless, development was slow throughout its early existence as it moved quickly eastward across the Caribbean Sea. Forward motion slowed as the storm progressed westward south of Jamaica on August 25. Though signs of development were first noted at around this time, later reanalysis was conducted on the system, revealing that it had already strengthened to the equivalent of a modern-day Category 1 hurricane. Shortly after, observations indicated that the hurricane was rapidly intensifying. Passing well north of the Swan Islands, the storm attained Category 2 intensity at 0600 UTC on August 26. Shortly after, the hurricane made its first landfall at a similar intensity on the northeastern tip of the Yucatán Peninsula late on August 27.

Once in the Gulf of Mexico on August 28, the hurricane moved northwest on a nearly linear path towards the Texas coast as it steadily intensified. By 0600 UTC on August 29, the storm reached Category 3 intensity with winds of 115 mph (185 km/h)—this would be the storm's maximum intensity. The hurricane then made landfall just after midnight on August 30 near Matagorda and Palacios, Texas. At the time, hurricane-force winds extended out 150 mi (240 km) from the storm's center of circulation. The hurricane's minimum central pressure at landfall was estimated at 950 mbar (950 hPa; 28 inHg), though a pressure reading of 952 mbar (952 hPa; 28.1 inHg) in Seadrift, Texas marked the lowest recorded pressure. Once inland, the storm quickly weakened, and degenerated to tropical storm strength at 1200 UTC on August 30 while located near Hallettsville, Texas. Weakening to a tropical depression the following day, it dissipated at 1200 UTC on August 30 near Sweetwater, Texas.

== Preparations and impact ==
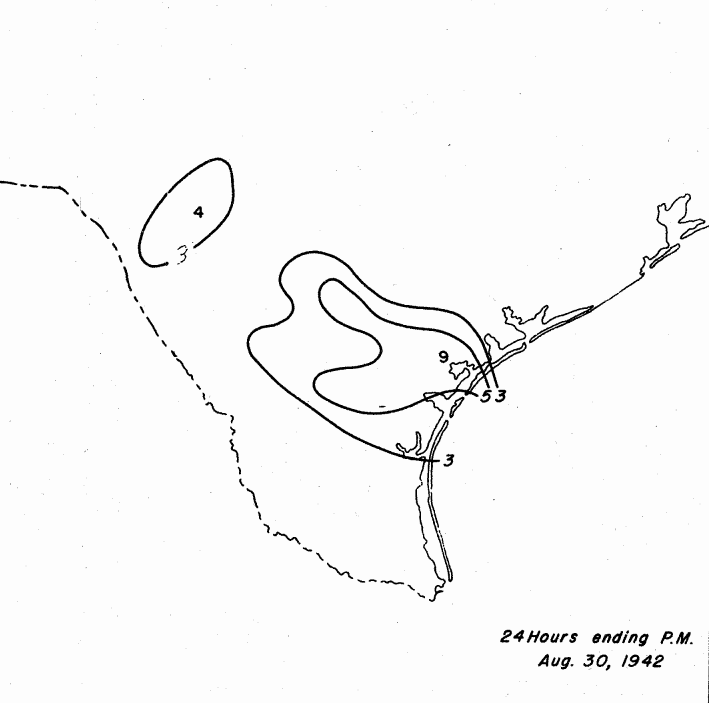
Rainfall totals in Texas

Despite making landfall on the Yucatán Peninsula on August 27 as a Category 2 hurricane, no damage was reported there. As the storm traversed the Gulf of Mexico towards the Texas Gulf Coast, evacuation procedures were conducted across the region. In the storm-warning area of Galveston, Texas, roughly 50,000 people evacuated inland; the high number of evacuees was likely due in part to another hurricane which struck the coast a week prior. Camp Hulen, located near Palacios, Texas, was also evacuated. Other coastal locations were evacuated via trucks, buses, and trains with the guidance of warnings published by the United States Weather Bureau. Schools in the region were prepared as emergency shelters in advance of the storm's landfall.

Upon making landfall near Palacios, Texas early on August 30, considerable damage was wrought to an extensive area of the state. At the coast, the hurricane produced a strong storm surge, mostly in the storm's eastern hemisphere. Storm tides were reported across the Texas coast up to southwestern Louisiana. A station in Matagorda, Texas recorded a storm tide 14.7 ft (4.5 m) above average. At the time, this was the third highest storm surge ever measured in Texas, behind peak observations taken during the 1919 Florida Keys hurricane and the 1900 Galveston hurricane. The unusually strong tide inundated Matagorda under 6 ft (1.8 m) of seawater. The accumulation of the hurricane's affects resulted in the destruction of nearly every building in the city. Due to debris and other sediments scattered by the strong waves, the reach of the Gulf Intracoastal Waterway in both the Matagorda and San Antonio Bays decreased by 540 ft^{2} (50 m^{2}). Further north in Freeport, Texas, the storm surge reached 11.8 ft (3.6 m) above normal. The strong wave action reopened two inlets near Corpus Christi Pass, and also destroyed two cottages on North Beach. In Harris County, Texas, located near the northern edge of the storm, crops sustained heavy damages, and losses to the rice crop alone amounted to $600,000.

The hurricane also brought strong winds which caused considerable damage as far inland as San Antonio, Texas, 120 mi (190 km) from the coast. In Seadrift, Texas, where the storm's lowest pressure reading of 952 mbar (952 hPa; 28.1 inHg) was recorded, winds were estimated to have reached 115 mph (185 km/h). The Halfmoon Reef Lighthouse, then situated offshore in Matagorda Bay, was knocked off its pilings due to the strong winds. As such, the United States Coast Guard decided to sell the lighthouse to a private owner. The lighthouse was later repositioned on land. In Matagorda and Palacios, winds of at least 100 mph (160 km/h) lasted roughly three hours, leveling several buildings. Later reports from Palacios indicated that the storm was the worst there since the 1900 Galveston hurricane. Due to the storm's fast motion before and after landfall, hurricane-force winds were felt as far inland as Atascosa County, Texas. In Corpus Christi, Texas, a peak wind gust of 72 mph (116 km/h) was reported. There, damage was limited to oil derricks and other light structures. Communications from the city to Port Aransas, Texas. The county sheriff of Victoria County, Texas reported that every house was "damaged to some extent." In Cuero, Texas, strong winds caused severe infrastructural and crop damage.

Precipitation associated with the storm was generally light due to the hurricane's rapid forward motion. Moderate to heavy rainfall was of local extent and covered a limited area of South Texas, peaking at 9.3 in (240 mm) in Woodsboro, Texas. Contrary to typical rapidly moving tropical cyclones, much of the storm's rainfall fell to the west and south of the storm throughout its duration, which up to that point was a phenomenon rarely observed. The peak rainfall measurement in Woodsboro was located 25 mi (40 km) away from the center of the hurricane. Throughout Atascosa County, at least 4 in (100 mm) of rain fell.

After making landfall, the hurricane's fast speed enabled it to still bring strong winds and impacts well inland. In South-Central Texas, the tropical cyclone was considered the worst of the entire 20th century. On August 30, despite being situated over the Austin and San Antonio metropolitan areas, the storm still retained maximum sustained winds of at least 50 mph (80 km/h). In Floresville, Texas, the winds damaged numerous buildings. Similar effects occurred in Atascosa County and Seguin, Texas, where trees were uprooted and additional buildings were damaged. In Seguin, the passing storm was considered the worst since the 1886 Indianola hurricane, which also moved rapidly inland. In New Braunfels, Texas, damage was confined to trees, while in Austin, Texas power lines were downed by the strong winds. San Antonio saw the brunt of the storm's impacts in South-Central Texas. Gusts reaching as high as 70 mph (110 km/h) battered the city for at least five hours, causing extensive damage to infrastructure, as well as causing numerous power outages. Hundreds of trees were uprooted, and the resulting damage was considered the worst since 1899. Despite being held to the ground by 8 ft (2.4 m) stakes, 70 of the 75 planes at Alamo Field. were damaged by the strong winds. Total estimated damages in the city amounted to $300,000.

Overall, the hurricane caused $26.5 million in damages, with $11.5 million to property and $15 million to crops, with the storm's damage in Texas spread across twelve counties. This would make the storm the most costly of the hurricane season. Despite the hurricane's wide swath of damage and strong intensity, only eight people were killed. The low number of fatalities is attributable to the extensive evacuation procedures which the area underwent prior to the storm, as well as warnings provided by the Weather Bureau.

== See also ==
- 1909 Velasco hurricane
- 1945 Texas hurricane
- Hurricane Celia
- List of Texas hurricanes (1900–49)
