= 1949 Texas hurricane =

Category 2 Atlantic hurricane in 1949

Hurricane Eleven
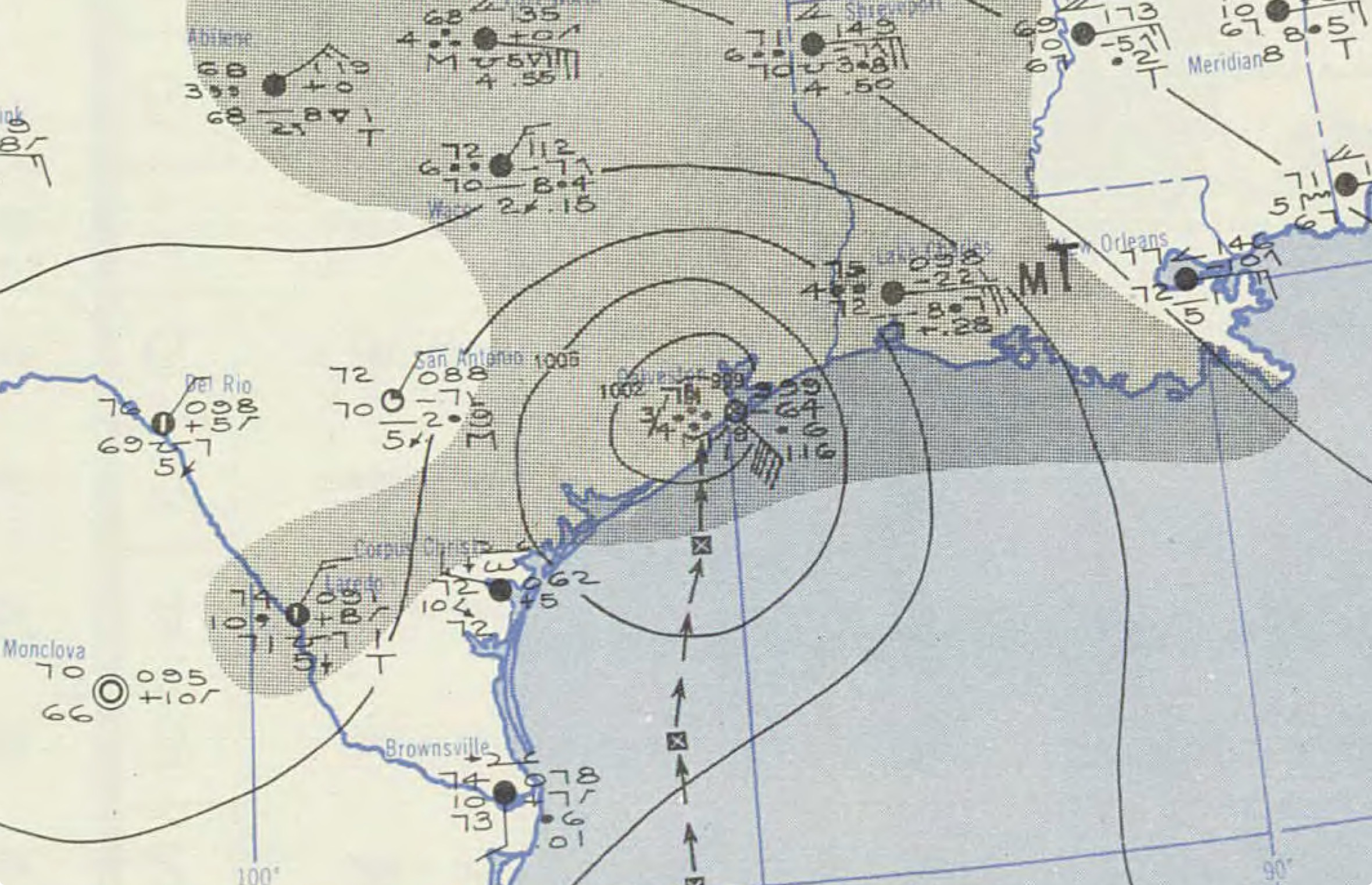
- Weather map of the hurricane making landfall in Texas on October 4

Meteorological history
- Formed: September 27, 1949 (Note: All times and dates are based on Coordinated Universal Time (UTC) unless otherwise noted.)
- Extratropical: October 6, 1949
- Dissipated: October 7, 1949

Category 2 hurricane
- 1-minute sustained (SSHWS/NWS)
- Highest winds: 110 mph (175 km/h)
- Lowest pressure: 965 mbar (hPa); 28.50 inHg

Overall effects
- Fatalities: 3 total (Note: Three deaths were directly attributed to the storm. However, the storm contributed to flooding in Guatemala that may have killed as many as 40,000 people.)
- Damage: $6.7 million (1949 USD)
- Areas affected: El Salvador, Guatemala, Honduras, Mexico, Belize, Texas, Louisiana, Arkansas, Missouri, Illinois
- IBTrACS
- Part of the 1949 Atlantic and Pacific hurricane seasons

The 1949 Texas hurricane was a tropical cyclone that crossed over from the eastern Pacific to the Atlantic, contributing to extensive flooding in Guatemala and impacting East Texas. Forming in the Pacific Ocean on September 27, the storm meandered across Central America and southern Mexico as a tropical depression. Rainfall from the developing storm helped exacerbate a flooding event over southern Guatemala that may have killed as many as 40,000 people. The storm then crossed into the Gulf of Mexico on October 1 and began to intensify. It ultimately peaked as a high-end Category 2-equivalent hurricane on the modern-day Saffir–Simpson hurricane scale and made landfall near Freeport, Texas, on the morning of October 4. It rapidly weakened after moving inland and dissipated several days later. Damage from the storm was moderate, although the hurricane temporarily cut off the city of Galveston from the mainland. Rice crops suffered extensive damage in Texas and Louisiana, with losses estimated at up to $10 million (equivalent to $135 million in 2025). Three fatalities are attributed to the hurricane.

== Meteorological history ==
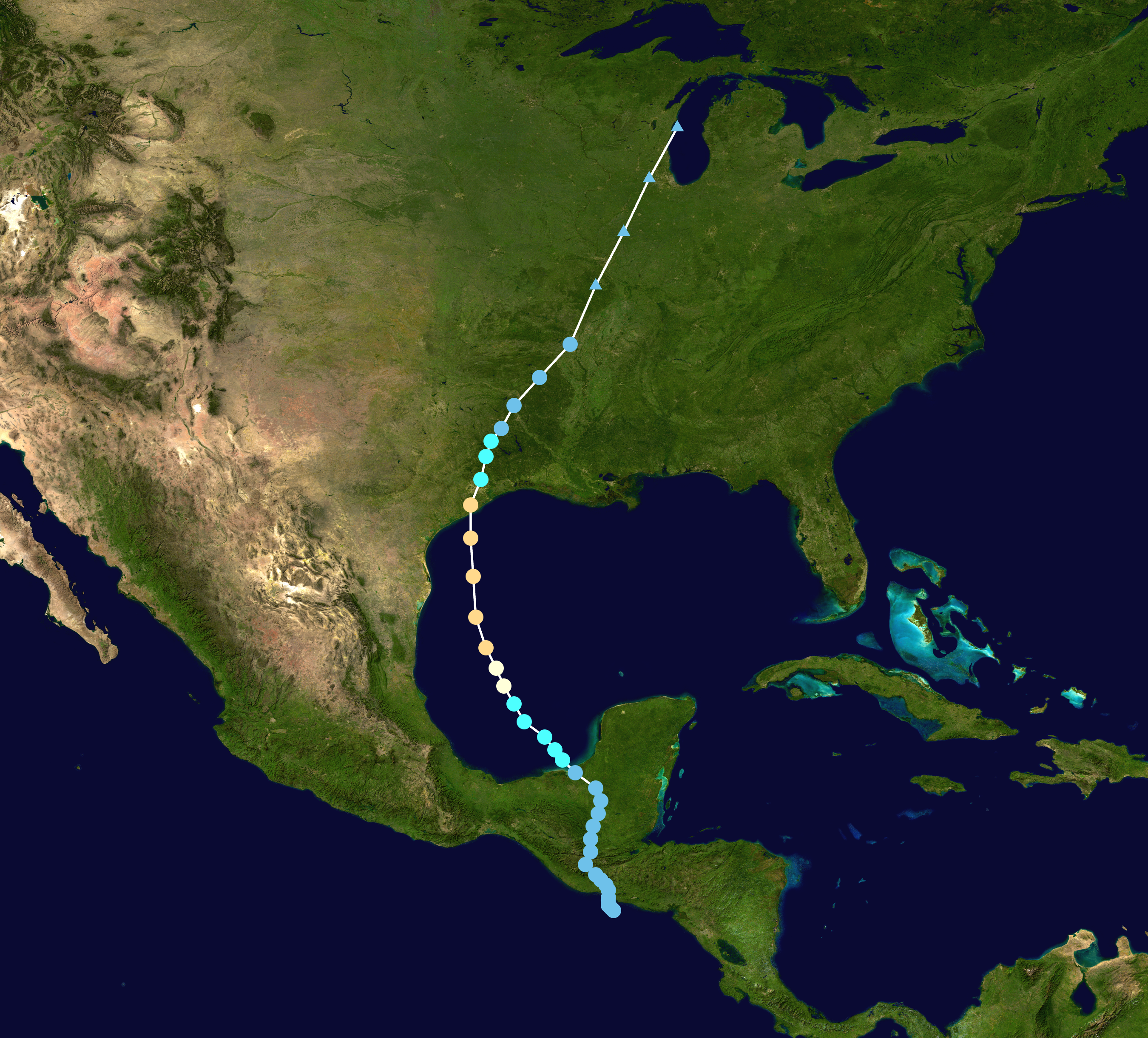
Map plotting the storm's track and intensity, according to the Saffir–Simpson scale Map key Saffir–Simpson scale Tropical depression (≤38 mph, ≤62 km/h) Tropical storm (39–73 mph, 63–118 km/h) Category 1 (74–95 mph, 119–153 km/h) Category 2 (96–110 mph, 154–177 km/h) Category 3 (111–129 mph, 178–208 km/h) Category 4 (130–156 mph, 209–251 km/h) Category 5 (≥157 mph, ≥252 km/h) Unknown Storm type Tropical cyclone Subtropical cyclone Extratropical cyclone, remnant low, tropical disturbance, or monsoon depression

The origins of the 1949 Texas hurricane are unclear due to the complex weather pattern that persisted over southern Mexico and Central America around the time of its formation. These areas were within a broad region of low air pressure between September 25–30. This low-pressure area likely stemmed at least in part from a tropical wave that moved westward from the Caribbean Sea into Central America on September 25–26, as well as the remnants of a previous hurricane. The Atlantic hurricane database (Note: HURricane DATa (HURDAT) is the official track database for tropical cyclones in the North Atlantic Ocean and contains information on the positions and intensities of storms dating back to 1851.) originally indicated that the tropical cyclone formed over the eastern Pacific on September 27.

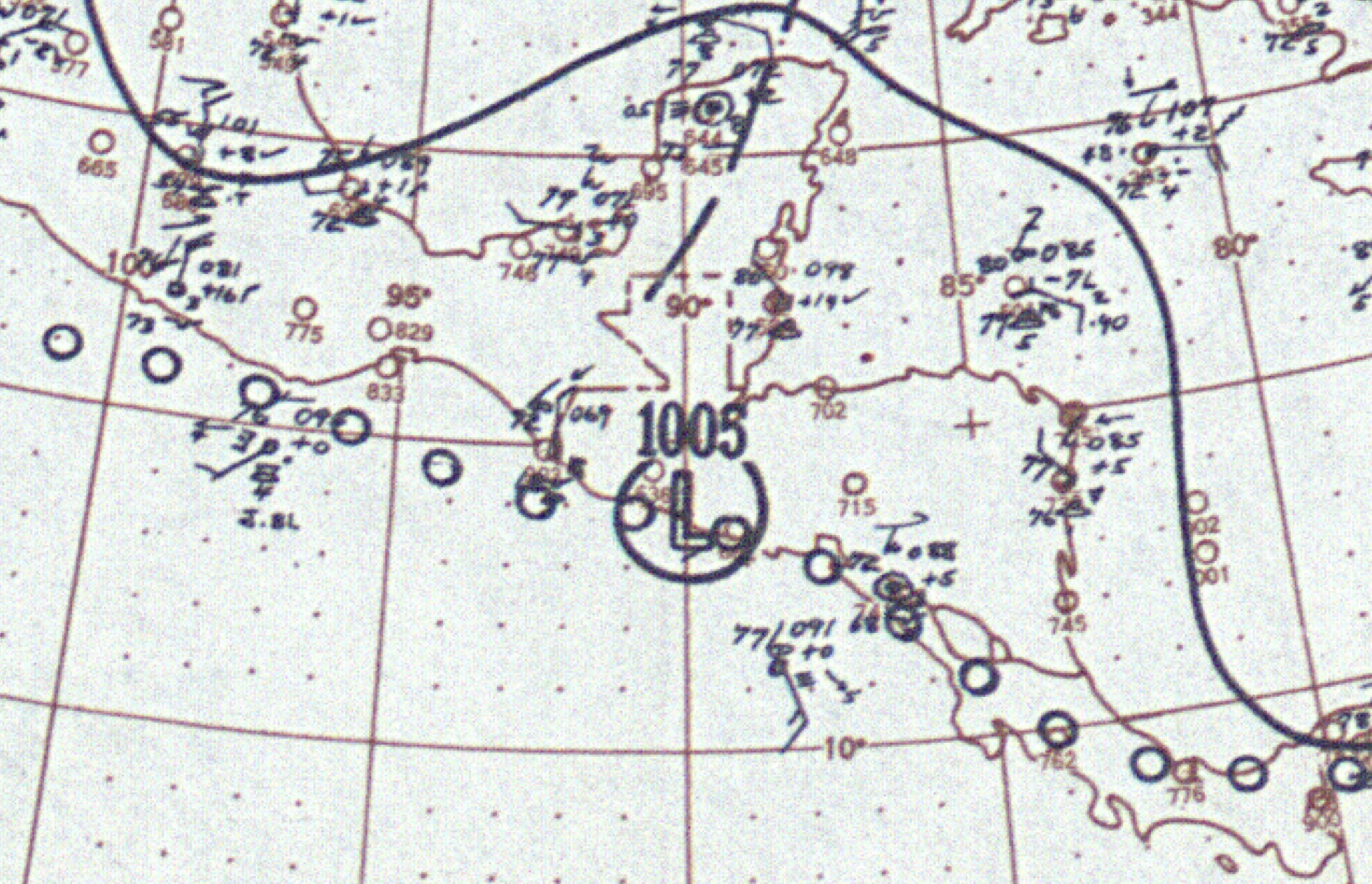
Weather map on September 27, showing the tropical depression in the Eastern Pacific Ocean at landfall in El Salvador

A review of the data conducted by the Atlantic Oceanographic and Meteorological Laboratory (AOML) in 2014 determined that there was insufficient evidence from weather observations to dispute such an origin, but noted that the available weather observations in the region did not report the higher winds or stronger pressure gradients typically associated with tropical cyclones. The database first lists the storm as a tropical depression at 06:00 UTC on September 27 just south of the border between Guatemala and El Salvador. The nascent tropical cyclone moved generally northward across Guatemala and southern Mexico over the next few days. Weather observations provided increasingly clearer evidence of the consolidated area of low-pressure associated with the tropical cyclone on September 29–30. The center of the broad and slow-moving cyclone tracked into the Bay of Campeche near Ciudad del Carmen by 06:00 UTC on October 1. Data from a nearby coastal weather station suggested that the cyclone had strengthened into a tropical storm around the time it re-emerged over water. It is relatively rare for a tropical cyclone to cross from the Pacific into the Atlantic, or vice versa; as of June 2020, only five storms have crossed from the eastern Pacific into the Atlantic since 1842, including the 1949 storm.

The tropical storm strengthened over the western Gulf of Mexico and reached hurricane intensity on October 2. The hurricane began to turn northward towards the Texas coast the next day. While reconnaissance aircraft did not reach the center of the storm during this period, the AOML determined based on peripheral flight data that the hurricane's maximum sustained wind speeds had increased to 110 mph (175 km/h), equivalent to a high-end Category 2 hurricane on the modern Saffir–Simpson hurricane wind scale. (Note: The Saffir–Simpson hurricane wind scale was developed in the 1970s.) The hurricane made landfall just west of Freeport, Texas, in the vicinity of 28.6°N 95.6°W around 05:00 UTC on October 4 (local midnight). The lowest barometric pressure observed by a land-based weather station was 978 mbar (hPa; 28.88 inHg) just east of the center of the storm. The AOML determined based on the nearby pressure data that the hurricane was a high-end Category 2 hurricane at landfall with maximum sustained winds of 110 mph (175 km/h) and a central pressure of 965 mbar (hPa; 28.50 inHg). (Note: The Atlantic hurricane database originally listed the storm as being a Category 4 hurricane at landfall.) This made the storm the fourth October hurricane to impact Texas since 1851, the beginning of the official Atlantic hurricane database. It later passed directly over Houston; the next storm to do so would be Hurricane Alicia in 1983. The storm turned north-northeastward and weakened after landfall, falling below hurricane and tropical storm intensity on October 4 over East Texas. The weakening system moved across Arkansas, southeastern Missouri, and Illinois. The storm encountered colder air and transitioned into an extratropical cyclone on October 6 before merging with a weather front over Lake Michigan the next day.

== Preparations and impact ==
=== Guatemala ===
Rainfall over Guatemala between September 28 and October 14 resulted in severe flooding. The early stages of the hurricane contributed in part to these rains. Richard Cunningham Patterson Jr., the U.S. Ambassador to Guatemala, reported that the flood was considered the worst in the Guatemala's history. The flooding primarily occurred along the southern part of the country. Considerable flooding occurred along the Coyolate River. Among the affected communities were the town of San Ana Mixtán and the hamlet of El Mango (today known as Santa Marta El Mar). The flood may have killed as many as 40,000 people, making it the deadliest natural disaster in the country's history. Total economic losses reached US$13.6 million.

=== United States ===
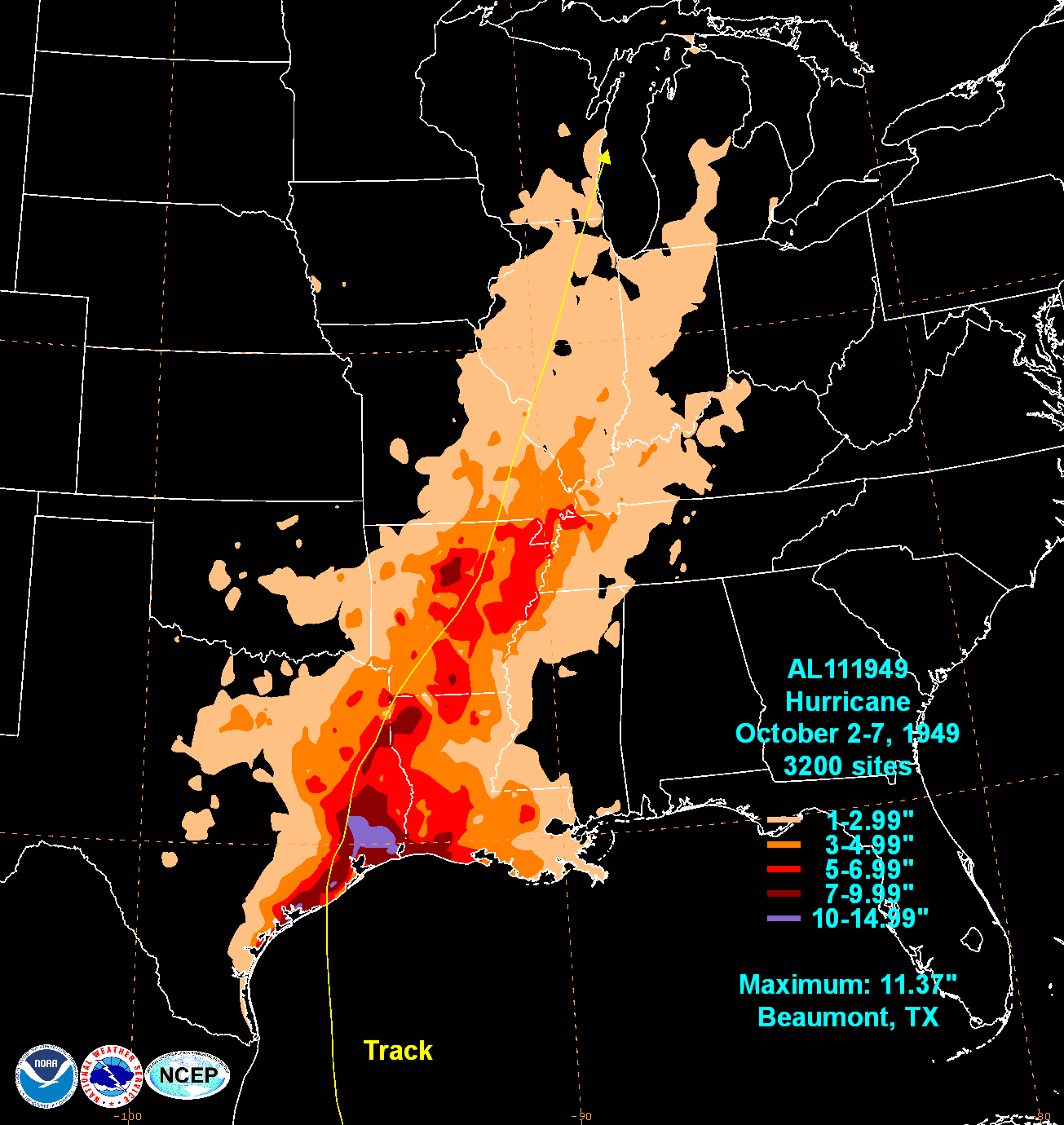
Rainfall totals associated with the hurricane in the U.S.

Throughout 10 cities in Texas, 50,000 sought shelter in advance of the hurricane. An estimated 28,000 residents fled to shelters; around 5,000 stayed in the Houston City Auditorium. Tropical cyclone watches and warnings were issued along coastal areas of Texas and Louisiana. Pioneer Air Lines removed its aircraft from Houston, while small watercraft were kept safe in port. Schools in Corpus Christi closed by October 3, as well as businesses in the threatened area.

The hurricane produced gusts of 135 mph (217 km/h) just west of Freeport, accompanied by an air pressure of 28.88 inches of mercury (978 hPa) and tides of 11.4 ft (3.5 m) above normal. Precipitation from the storm was heavy, peaking at 14.5 in (370 mm) at Goodrich. Rainfall extended eastward into Louisiana, amounting to 6.81 in (173 mm) at Shreveport, Louisiana. More rainfall was recorded in Shreveport during October 4–6 than any prior 48-hour period in October on record in the city. The heavy rains damaged crops and caused generally minor flooding along streams flowing towards the western Gulf of Mexico. Urban areas sustained generally light damage. In Houston, the winds shattered some store windows and distributed debris. Galveston was temporarily cut off from the mainland during the hurricane when water surpassed the city's seawall. A fishing pier was destroyed and warehouses or buildings outside the protection of the seawall were damaged or washed away by the high surf. The hurricane spawned a minor tornado which struck the community of Riceville, injuring two children. Nearly all piers and buildings along the waterfront between Texas City and La Porte were damaged by the storm surge and high winds. Freeport reportedly suffered the worst damage, costing approximately $150,000.

A pier at Port Aransas was largely destroyed at a cost of $10,000. The hurricane caused extensive damage to rice, cotton, and vegetable crops in the region. The rice and cotton crop in western Louisiana were badly affected, with around 10 percent of unharvested rice and 25 percent of unpicked cotton damaged. The damage rendered around half of recovered rice seeds unusable for replanting. An estimate several days after the storm placed the total quantity of rice damaged at 500,000 bushels, totaling $10 million in monetary losses. However, Zoch (1949) reported that total damage from the storm was $6.7 million. Following the storm, thousands of automobiles in six states were affected by widespread peeling and blistering paint. The blisters, usually concentrated on the hoods, fenders and tops of vehicles, contained a small amount of water, and peeling paint was also reported on one Shreveport home. Most of the cars damaged were parked outside, and sheltered automobiles were unaffected. Although total damage from the phenomenon may have reached thousands of dollars, experts were unable to identify its cause immediately following the storm. Two deaths were attributed to the storm in Texas: a resident of Port Neches who was electrocuted, and a young woman who drowned in Matagorda Bay.

Winds up to 35 mph (56 km/h) and heavy rains accompanied the storm in southern Arkansas and northwestern Mississippi. One person was killed in Magnolia, Arkansas, after strong winds toppled an oil derrick. The hurricane added to a period of heavy rainfall in Arkansas, damaging rice and cotton crops; a four-day rainfall total of 9.01 in (229 mm) was recorded in Clinton. The extratropical remnants of the hurricane brought rains into the Midwestern United States. Rainfall accumulations reached 1–3 in (25–76 mm) across Illinois on October 5–6, with the heaviest rains falling in the southern part of the state.

== See also ==
- List of Texas hurricanes (1900–1949)
- Tropical Storm Hermine (2010)
- Hurricane Jerry (1989)
- 1934 Central America hurricane
- Tropical storms Amanda and Cristobal

== Sources ==
- Hagen, Andrew; Strahan-Sakoskie, Donna; Luckett, Christopher (July 2012). "A Reanalysis of the 1944–53 Atlantic Hurricane Seasons—The First Decade of Aircraft Reconnaissance". Journal of Climate. 25 (13). Boston: American Meteorological Society: 4441–60. Bibcode:2012JCli...25.4441H. doi:10.1175/JCLI-D-11-00419.1.
- International Best Track Archive for Climate Stewardship (IBTrACS) (May 2021). IBTrACS browser (hosted by UNC Asheville) (Report). National Centers for Environmental Information – via World Data Center for Meteorology.
- Norcross, Bryan (2007). Hurricane Almanac: The Essential Guide to Storms Past, Present, and Future. Macmillan. ISBN 978-0-312-37152-4.
- Zoch, Richmond T. (December 1949). "North Atlantic Hurricanes and Tropical Disturbances of 1949" (PDF). Monthly Weather Review. 77 (12). Boston: American Meteorological Society: 339–342. Bibcode:1949MWRv...77..339Z. doi:10.1175/1520-0493(1949)077<0339:NAHATD>2.0.CO;2.
