= List of Texas hurricanes (1900–1949) =

The List of Texas hurricanes from 1900 to 1949 encompasses 47 tropical cyclones that affected the U.S. state of Texas. The season with the most storms to affect the state was the 1933 Atlantic hurricane season, when five storms affected Texas. Major storms during this period include the 1900 and 1915 Galveston hurricanes, the former which killed 8,000 to 12,000 people. Also one to merit mention was the 1943 Surprise Hurricane, when the weather bureau's information was censored.

== 1900–1909 ==
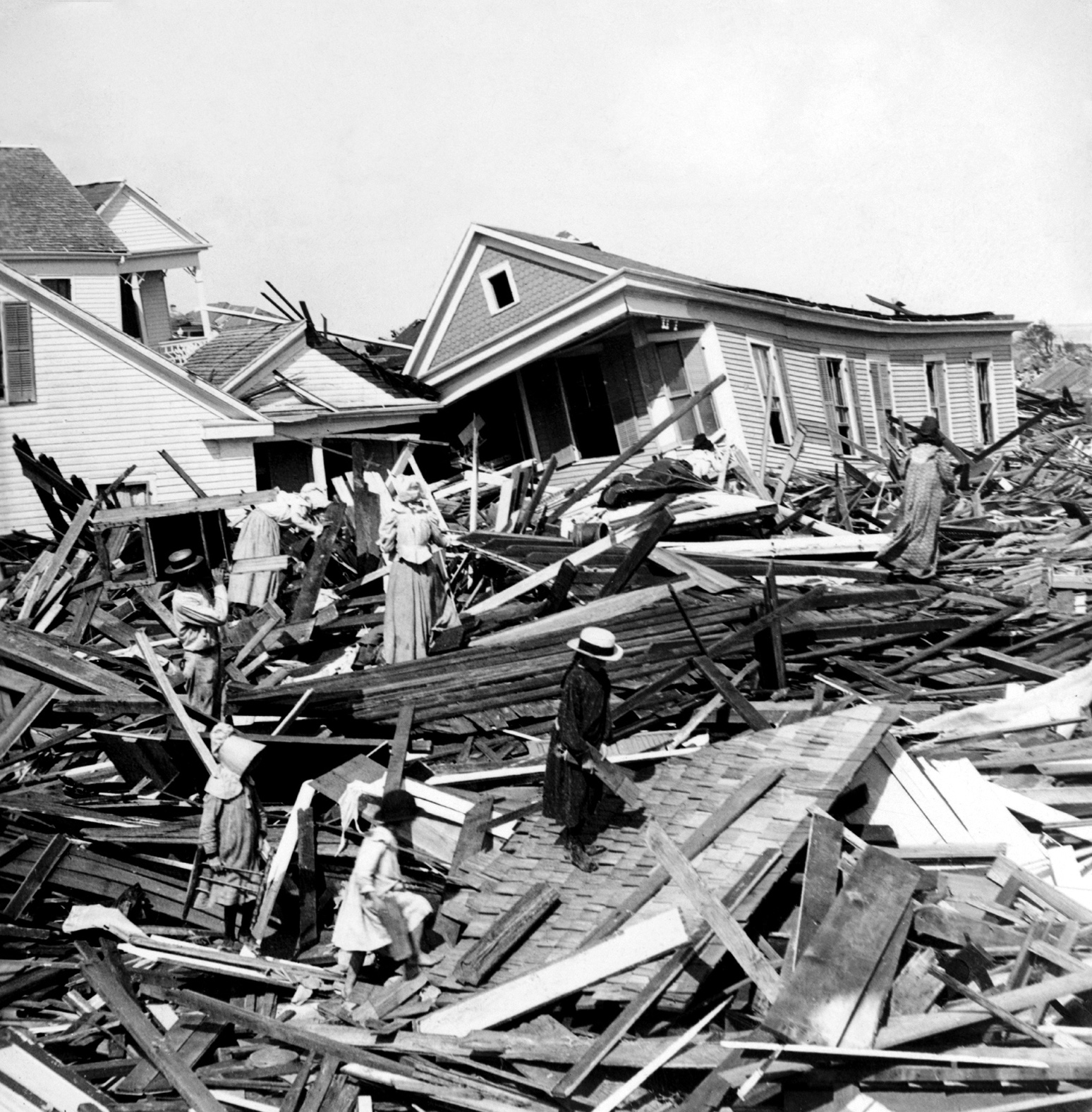
Galveston was largely destroyed by a Category 4 hurricane in 1900, killing 6,000–12,000 people.

- September 9, 1900 – The 1900 Galveston hurricane makes landfall on the southern end of Galveston Island as a Category 4 hurricane. The storm kills an estimated 6,000–12,000 people, making it the deadliest natural disaster in United States history; much of the damage occurs in the port city of Galveston, which is largely destroyed by a 15 ft (4.6 m) storm surge. All Galveston homes are damaged, of which 3,636 are destroyed; numerous public buildings and places of worship are also damaged or destroyed. The damage toll is estimated at $30 million in the city. Approximately 10,000 people in Galveston are left homeless, representing roughly a fourth of the city's total population. Surrounding communities are also heavily impacted, incurring $3 million in damage; several locales report the complete loss of homes and buildings. Galveston undergoes significant changes in the storm's aftermath: the municipal governing apparatus changes to a city commission government, 2,146 buildings are elevated to facilitate the raising of Galveston Island, and a 6 mi (9.7 km) long and 17 ft (5.2 m) high seawall is built.
- July 10, 1901 – the second tropical storm of 1901 moves ashore near Matagorda with winds of 50 mph (80 km/h). Gusty winds are reported inland to San Antonio, with elevated tides reaching the waterfront streets of Galveston. A few homes are swept from their foundations in Galveston and small craft and marinas are damaged in Port Lavaca.
- June 26, 1902 – the second hurricane of 1902 parallels the length of Padre Island before making landfall on Port Lavaca as a high-end tropical storm. Strong winds from the large system damage buildings in Edna, El Campo, and Franklin. A wide swath of rain causes flash flooding in East Texas, setting a 24-hour rainfall record in Nacogdoches for June. Swollen creeks inundate the south side of the city.
- July 26, 1908 – the fourth tropical storm of the 1908 season develops just off the Texas coast before moving into neighboring Louisiana. The storm produces 3 in (0.076 m) rainfall totals along Texas' eastern border.
- September 18, 1908 – a high-end tropical storm approaches the Texas coast but dissipates before reaching land. Showers ahead of the storm cause gusty winds and heavy rainfall in Galveston, flooding streets and blowing out windows. Telecommunications in the city are also disrupted.
- June 29, 1909 – a Category 2 hurricane strikes the Brownsville area with 100 mph (160 km/h) winds, causing $113,000 in damage. Several buildings collapse along the Rio Grande Valley due to the winds. Flooding rains—up to 6 in (150 mm) in Llano Grande—cause the most significant swelling of the Rio Grande in five years, displacing many from their homes; other nearby rivers and lakes overflow their banks and cause further inundation.
- July 21, 1909 – The 1909 Velasco hurricane makes landfall on Velasco as a Category 3 storm, causing $2 million in damage and 41 fatalities. Damage is wrought throughout southeastern and central Texas, with widespread loss of crops and uprooted trees. At Velsaco, a 20 ft (6.1 m) storm surge destroyed much of the city, leaving only eight buildings intact. The hurricane's effects spread well-inland, producing heavy rainfall and gustiness over Central Texas; in Austin, where homes were unroofed, the storm is considered the worst in living memory.
- August 27, 1909 – The 1909 Monterrey hurricane brings rough surf to the South Texas coast as the center of the storm passes farther south. The storm surge inundates Port Isabel and destroys most structures on Tarpon Beach near Corpus Christi, where gusts are clocked at 66 mph (106 km/h). Low-lying areas of Corpus Christi are inundated under 1–3 in (25–76 mm), particularly to the north and northwest of the city along Nueces Bay.

== 1910–1919 ==
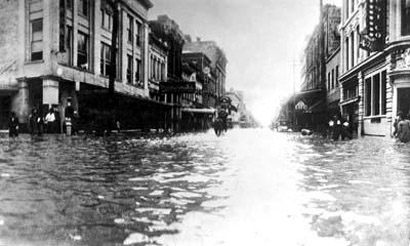
Flooding in Galveston after the 1915 hurricane

- August 31, 1910 – the second tropical storm of the 1910 season moves inland over Mexico just south of the mouth of the Rio Grande, causing some property damage in Brownsville and Port Isabel.
- September 14, 1910 – a hurricane makes landfall along the South Texas coast. Padre Island is completely inundated by the storm surge, and southern extents of the island experience winds of 120 mph (190 km/h); winds of 61 mph (98 km/h) are felt farther north at Corpus Christi. Heavy rainfall occurs across the Rio Grande Valley, setting a few 24-hour rainfall records and causing slight damage.
- October 16, 1912 – a Category 2 hurricane crosses a sparsely populated stretch of Padre Island between Corpus Christi and Port Mansfield. A 6 ft-high (1.8 m) storm surge coupled with abnormally high tides causes severe damage along the coast, sweeping buildings away and inflicting $28,000 in damage The steamship Nicaragua capsizes east of Padre Island, resulting in the loss of six crewmembers.
- June 28, 1913 – a low-end hurricane, the first of the 1913 season, makes landfall in southern Texas. Significant flooding is maximized in Montell, where 20.60 in (523 mm) of rain is recorded, setting a state record for the highest 24-hour rainfall total. The floods wash away houses and disrupt telecommunications. One person drowns in the Montell area.
- August 17, 1915 – The 1915 Galveston hurricane moves ashore San Luis Pass as a Category 4 hurricane with winds of 145 mph (235 km/h), killing 275 people. Storm surge peaks at 16.2 ft (4.9 m) with wave heights exceeding 20 ft (6.1 m). Galveston's newly built seawall mitigates a repeat of the 1900 hurricane, though unprotected areas of the city and Galveston Island suffer the complete destruction of many homes. Coastal cities along Galveston Bay are destroyed by the storm surge. Strong winds and heavy rainfall across East Texas severely impact the cotton crop, exacerbated further by the flooding of several rivers.
- August 6, 1916 – a tropical storm moves inland just south of the Texas–Mexico border, bringing 50 mph (80 km/h) winds along the South Texas coast.
- August 16, 1916 – South Texas is struck by a rapidly-moving Category 4 hurricane, causing widespread damage. The worst effects are felt in the Corpus Christi area where measured winds top out at 90 mph (140 km/h). The city's waterfront areas sustain the severest damage, including the loss of all wharves and other coastal structures. Significant destruction is wrought to nearby communities including Aransas Pass, Rockport, and Kingsville. The damage toll reaches $1.8 million and 20 people are killed.
- August 6–7, 1918 – the first Atlantic tropical cyclone of 1918 passes over East Texas as a tropical storm after striking Louisiana near the Sabine River as a major hurricane. Rainfall accumulations of 2–3 in (50–75 mm) are recorded along the Texas-Louisiana border, with the storm's heavy rains reaching as far west as Crosby. Winds reach approximately 60 mph (95 km/h) in Sabine. The storm downs all telegraph lines east of Mauriceville and disrupts rail service.
- September 14, 1919 – The 1919 Florida Keys hurricane makes landfall just south of Corpus Christi, Texas as a Category 3. Heavy rain is common across southern Texas with many locations setting daily rainfall records. The storm kills 310 people in Texas (284 in Corpus Christi), although the death toll may have been as high as 600.

== 1920–1929 ==
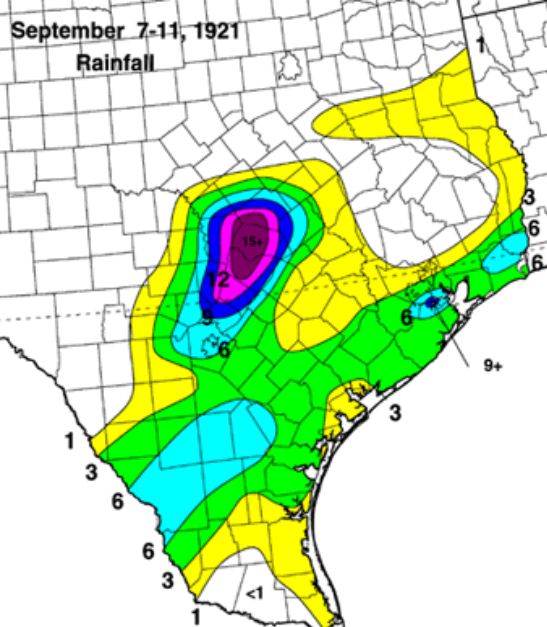
Contour map of rainfall totals from the 1921 flood

- September 21, 1920 – the outer fringes of a hurricane moving ashore the Louisiana coast produce rainfall over northeastern Texas, with a maximum of 1.2 in (30 mm) in Beaumont.
- September 7–11, 1921 – the remnants of a low-end hurricane stream northward into Texas after striking just south of Tampico, Mexico, causing significant flooding in Central Texas. A peak rainfall total of 40 in (1,000 mm) is documented in Thrall over a three-day period with 32 in (810 mm) accumulating in 12 hours; this would set a new national record for 12-hour rainfall. Overflowing rivers and streams flood widespread areas, causing loss of crops of property. The flooding causes at least $19 million in damage and claims the lives of 215 people, making it the deadliest flood in Texas history. Parts of San Antonio are inundated by floodwaters 7 ft (2.1 m) deep in what the San Antonio Express-News calls the greatest disaster in the city's history; 51 deaths occur in San Antonio. Along the Little River, 159 people drown.
- June 16, 1922 – rainfall from a tropical storm causes heavy flooding along the Rio Grande, with the river cresting 29.6 ft (9.0 m) above flood stage at Eagle Pass. Downstream flooding inundates many towns in Cameron and Hidalgo counties. Crops sustain $2 million in damage.
- September 7, 1925 – a tropical storm moving ashore just south of the Texas–Mexico border causes gale-force winds and rainfall over parts of South Texas, along with a storm surge along Padre Island. Winds at Corpus Christi peak at 42 mph (68 km/h). Near Brownsville and Port Isabel, widespread flooding maroons cars and disrupts transportation.
- September 8, 1928 – a tropical storm moves inland into Mexico south of the Texas border, leading to squally conditions along the Texas coast northward to Corpus Christi, where winds of 35 mph (56 km/h) are registered.
- June 28, 1929 – a compact Category 1 hurricane makes landfall southwest of Port O'Connor, causing $675,000 in damage and killing three people; all three people were in Wharton County. Winds at Port Lavaca reach an estimated 80–90 mph (130–140 km/h), though the storm's small size leads to a narrow corridor of damage. Power poles, signage, trees, and small buildings are toppled by the squally conditions.

== 1930s ==
The first storm of 1931 made landfall in the Galveston area as a tropical storm.

In 1932, the 1932 Freeport hurricane formed August 11 in the southern Gulf of Mexico near the Yucatán Peninsula and slammed into the upper Texas coast near Freeport, Texas as a very compact Category 4 hurricane two days later. As the storm moved over the Gulf of Mexico, it intensified from a Category 1 to a Category 4 with winds estimated at 140 mph and an estimated central pressure of 942 millibars in less than one day. The eye crossed the coast about 10 p.m. on August 13, slashing a 30- to 40-mile wide path of destruction across Brazoria County, Texas. Official warning for the storm came just 4 hours prior to landfall, and many people trying to evacuate inland had to abandon their cars in high winds and heavy rains. The 1932 hurricane retained its strength miles from the coast and killed 40 people. The greatest single toll for any town was 7 in West Columbia, Texas, where sustained winds over 100 mph flattened homes. Two neighborhoods that had been constructed for oil industry workers there were wiped clean. Freeport, Angleton and Galveston suffered extensive wind damage, and the inland towns of Brazoria, West Columbia, Damon and Needville, all in the path of the eye, were also devastated. Damage estimates topped $7 million in 1932 U.S. dollars.

The Texas area was alive with activity in 1933, with the second storm making landfall in Mexico after threatening Texas; the fourth storm making landfall near Matagorda Bay in Texas as a 45 mph (70 km/h) tropical storm on July 23. The fifth storm made landfall near Brownsville, Texas on August 5 as a strong tropical storm. The storm produced strong winds and high tides along the coast of Texas, while heavy rains in south Texas and northern Mexico caused heavy damage. High tides from the storm covered parts of South Padre Island. The tenth storm threatened Texas, causing the issuance of tropical storm warnings for portions of the southern Texas coastline. The eleventh storm made landfall just north of Brownsville early on September 5, killing 179 people and causing $28 million in damage.

In 1934, the third storm was a Category 1 hurricane passed over north Florida as a tropical storm and made landfall in central Texas, causing 11 casualties and $1–$2 million in damage. The fifth storm was another Category 1 hurricane that grazed Galveston.

The third storm of the 1936 season caused severe crop damage was reported in San Patricio and Nueces Counties. In all, the hurricane caused $550,000 (1936 USD) in damage, primarily to oil refinery property, though no deaths or injuries were reported. The fourteenth storm of the season made landfall near Brownsville.

The third and fifth storms of 1938 made landfall in the state.

== 1940s ==
- August 7, 1940 – The 1940 Louisiana hurricane hits the Texas/Louisiana border, and dissipates three days later over Missouri. One casualty and $1.7 million in damage from flooding are attributed to this hurricane.
- September 11, 1941 – Tropical Storm One hits the Texas coast between Galveston and Port Arthur. The storm dissipates the next day without causing any damage.
- September 23, 1941 – The 1941 Texas hurricane hits Texas east of Bay City as a major hurricane. It continues northward, and becomes extratropical later that day. The hurricane causes heavy flooding in Texas, amounting to $7 million in damage (1941 dollars) and 4 deaths. Houston is especially hit hard with winds up to 77 mph, killing three people and knocking out power to some sections of the city. Glass windows in downtown stores are shattered and 15 truckloads of shattered glass were removed after the storm.
- August 23, 1942 – Hurricane Two makes landfall near Crystal Beach, and dissipates two days later over extreme southern Missouri. The hurricane causes around $600,000 in damage.
- August 30, 1942 – The 1942 Matagorda hurricane hits the central Texas coast near Matagorda, and dissipates over northwestern Texas, after resulting in $26.5 million in damage and eight deaths. Wind damage is reported as far inland as San Antonio.
- July 27, 1943 – The 1943 Surprise Hurricane hurricane was first detected on July 26, 1943. The United States was in the middle of the second World War and there were no satellites or weather radar. Because of the fear of U-boats in the Gulf, all radio traffic from ships was silenced, including storm reports. Newspaper articles mentioned a tropical storm in the Gulf of Mexico, but did not mention its true intensity. The storm hits Bolivar Peninsula on July 27, crosses Galveston Bay, and makes landfall a second time near the Houston Ship Channel. Because of war interests, warnings were few, and residents were caught off-guard. Maximum sustained winds were estimated at nearly 100 mph, with higher wind gusts. Damage was significant and primarily wind-related. The storm killed 19 people, and caused $17 million (1943 dollars) in damage to the Houston area. After the loss of life in this storm, weather information has never been censored again.

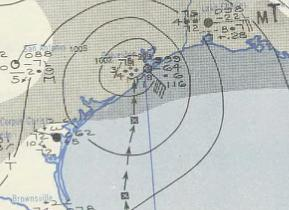
Surface weather analysis of the 1949 Texas hurricane

- July 22, 1945 – The Tropical Storm Two hits South Texas, causing squalls and rough seas.
- August 28, 1945 – The 1945 Texas hurricane makes landfall on Port O'Connor with winds of 110 mph (180 km/h). The storm causes flooding across much of the coast, peaking at an estimated 30 inches (760 mm). Port Lavaca is inundated by a 15-foot storm tide (4.6 m), with the coastline retreating as much as 50 ft (15 m) in locations due to the storm. The hurricane causes three deaths and roughly $20 million in damages.
- June 16, 1946 – Tropical Storm One moves ashore near the Texas/Louisiana border, causing no damage.
- August 2, 1947 – Tropical Storm One makes landfall on Port Isabel with 40 mph (64 km/h) winds, causing heavy rain. Rainfall peaks at 9.78 inches (248 mm) at Raymondville. The storm causes one death and $2 million in damages, but the rain benefits many crops in East Texas.
- August 2, 1947 – Hurricane Three makes landfall on Galveston as a minimal hurricane, causing primarily wind damage to multiple structures. The hurricane causes one death and $2 million in damages.
- October 3, 1949 – The 1949 Texas hurricane makes landfall near Freeport with winds of 135 miles per hour (217 km/h) after crossing into the Gulf of Mexico from the East Pacific. In advance of the storm 50,000 people sought shelter. Rainfall peaks in Goodrich at 14.5 inches (370 mm). The hurricane causes severe crop losses in the region. Power outages also take place across the region, with the entire city of Freeport losing power. The storm kills two people and causes $6.7 million in damages, most of which are attributed to crop losses.

== Listed by month ==
Number of recorded storms affecting Texas
Month	Number of storms
June	8
July	7
August	16
September	13
October	3

== Deadly storms ==
The following is a list of hurricanes with known deaths in the state.

Tropical storms causing known deaths in Texas
Name	Year	Number of deaths
Galveston	1900	~8,000
Galveston	1915	275
Unnamed	1933	179
Velasco	1909	41
Freeport	1932	40
Texas	1916	20
Surprise	1943	19
Unnamed	1934	11
Unnamed	1942	8
Unnamed	1912	6
Unnamed	1941	4
Unnamed	1945	3
Unnamed	1949	2
Unnamed	1947	1
Unnamed	1940	1
Unnamed	1913	1
