= 1949 Eastern Guatemalan floods =

1949 series of floods

- Date: October 14–16, 1949
- Type: Flood
- Deaths: 4,000
- Property damage: $15,000,000 to $40,000,000 (1949 USD) (Note: All losses are in 1949 USD unless otherwise noted.) $203 million to $541 million (2025 USD)

On October 14–16, 1949, a series of violent and devastating floods killed an estimated 1,000 to 40,000 people in Central America, principally Guatemala. Estimates of the death toll ranged from 1,000 to 40,000, with reliable estimates suggesting 4,000 fatalities, placing the floods as some of the deadliest in recorded history. Estimated monetary losses ranged from $15,000,000 to $40,000,000.

Landslides and road blockages affected communications within the country, and also impacted distribution of foods and other resources. As news of the floodings in Guatemala broke international headlines, Foreign governments pledged aid to the recovery of the country accordingly. The neighbouring countries of The United States and Cuba rushed to provide immediate aid by plane to victims of the disaster.

== Background ==
A string of rainstorms, which were claimed to be the worst in Guatemala's history, occurred from September 28–October 18, with most of the heaviest rainfall occurring on October 14–16. An excerpt from the New York Times provides greater understanding of the cause and effects of the flood.

"Seventy-two hours of torrential rains caused Lakes Atitlán and Amatitlán to spill over the towns surrounding them, while many rivers and mountain streams burst their banks."

== Impact ==
The estimated number of people affected by the disaster varies widely amongst sources. At the time of the floods, the government placed this number at a maximum of 20,000 people, while news sources reported around 100,000 people being forced into homelessness. The death toll at the time of the event was estimated by the Government at around 1000 people, however, modern day analysis suggests that around 40,000 people were killed by the flooding. The American Ambassador in Guatemala, Richard Patterson, Jr., outlined in a telegram to the U.S. President Truman some of the ambiguity concerning the death toll at the time of the event.

"My impression based upon three-day intensive survey including long flight over affected areas, talks with President Gonzáles Arévalo, other government officials and representative businessmen, is that devastation and loss life result floods exaggerated by press (encouraged intentionally or unintentionally by government), that immediate relief needs well in hand, but that country suffered heavily economically and government confronted serious long-range financial problem respecting rehabilitation."

A reported emergency period of 30–60 days immediately followed the disaster, directly affecting the 260,000 inhabitants of Guatemala at the time. Unlike many other great floods of the world, no widespread epidemics were reported.

== Aftermath and recovery ==
Apart from the direct deadly consequences of the floods, the disaster had a huge impact in many other spheres of life in Guatemala. It is estimated that the financial consequences of the floods ranged from $15,000,000 to $40,000,000. A quote from the US ambassador in Guatemala detailed the long term financial effects of the floods;

"The chief problem confronting the Government, however, is long range financing, since foreign exchange holdings will be diminished and Government spending increased at a time when a budget deficit is in prospect".

Reports from the U.S embassy stated that flood water had covered kilometres of low roads, highways, and crop fields. Economically, one source reported that much of Guatemala's infrastructure had been destroyed in the disaster, and widespread damage had been caused to a number of cities.

"More than fifty bridges and 1,200 miles [1,900 km] of highways were destroyed. Rivers changed their course. Some towns, such as San Juan Osculcalco, were reported destroyed by landslides".

Another source detailed the devastation the flood had on one town in particular. The mudslides caused by the flooding in Tzununa stripped hillsides bare and covered much of the town with mud and rock, requiring much of the town's housing and residential centre to be relocated to higher, safer ground. The towns of Escuintla, San Marcos, Quezaltenango, Jalapa, Santa Rosa, Jutiapa and Sacatepequez were also some of the worst affected by the flooding, many of which required extensive repairs and aid. Landslides and road blockages affected communications within the country, and also impacted distribution of foods and other resources. Apart from this, Guatemala also sustained agricultural damage to two of the countries chief crop exports, coffee and banana crops, which suffered losses of ten and twenty percent respectively. Many other crop losses, including corn, beans and rice were sustained, along with considerable losses in the livestock sector. As news of the floodings in Guatemala broke international headlines, Foreign governments pledged aid to the recovery of the country accordingly. The neighbouring countries of The United States and Cuba rushed to provide immediate aid by plane to victims of the disaster. The Israel Government gifted $10,000 to Guatemalan Foreign Minister Ismal Gonzalez Arevalo, to be used for relief of flood victims in Guatemala. The Guatemalan Government also requested an immediate grant of $2,000,000 from American Congress to begin implementing rescue and relief work and reported an immediate need for clothing, medicine, and other relief supplies. The U.S embassy reported that relief supplies and a Red Cross expert had been flown from Panama, as well as an amphibian plane to rescue stranded American tourists. Medical supplies, food and water were also being distributed by the Guatemalan military and private planes to isolated villages and towns.

"Three planes left here early today to carry aid to the flood victims of Guatemala. The group of relief workers who carried first aid to the sufferers of the recent earthquake in Ecuador went along. One amphibian plane will attempt a landing on Lake Atitlán, in the Guatemalan mountains, to determine the possibility of evacuating the Indian inhabitants from villages on the lake shore".

== Significance ==
According to the Global Facility for Disaster Reduction and Recovery (ThinkHazard!), Guatemala has high disaster risks associated with several categories including river, urban and coastal floods, and tsunamis. This data indicates that potentially harmful and life-threatening floods are expected to occur at least once a decade. Similarly, Guatemala is ranked amongst the top five countries most affected by floods, with 40.8% of the population affected by five or more hazards. Guatemala's risk of cyclone is also ranked as high, indicating there is a 20 percent chance that infrastructure damaging wind speeds are likely to occur in the next 20 years. The countries placement, between the Caribbean Sea and the Pacific Ocean makes it a particular target for hurricanes and other tropical cyclones, however most of the damage that occurs in this region is due to the flooding and landslides that result from these hurricanes, rather than the winds 80.3% of the country's gross domestic product is located in high risk areas. Consequently, the hazardous location of Guatemala can be taken into account as a factor into the cause and deadly nature of the 1949 flood. Guatemala's aid relationship with the US and other international organisations has been extensive in the past, and has helped to develop the countries economic and political environment. However, foreign aid is only effective under the assumption that the recipient government is willing and dedicated to the wellbeing of the citizens. An audit in 1984 revealed that ten out of ten aid projects in Guatemala suffered major delays, and did not fulfil their planned objectives. Similarly, the motives behind US foreign aid are sometimes questioned, as to whether America's aid is simply an investment returning in furthering the countries interests and western ideologies.

== See also ==
- List of floods

== Sources ==
- Goodwin, Ralph R.; Glennon, John P.; Mabon, David W.; et al., eds. (1976). Foreign Relations of the United States, 1949. Vol. 2. Washington, D.C.: Government Printing Office.
