= 1909 Velasco hurricane =

Category 3 Atlantic hurricane in 1909

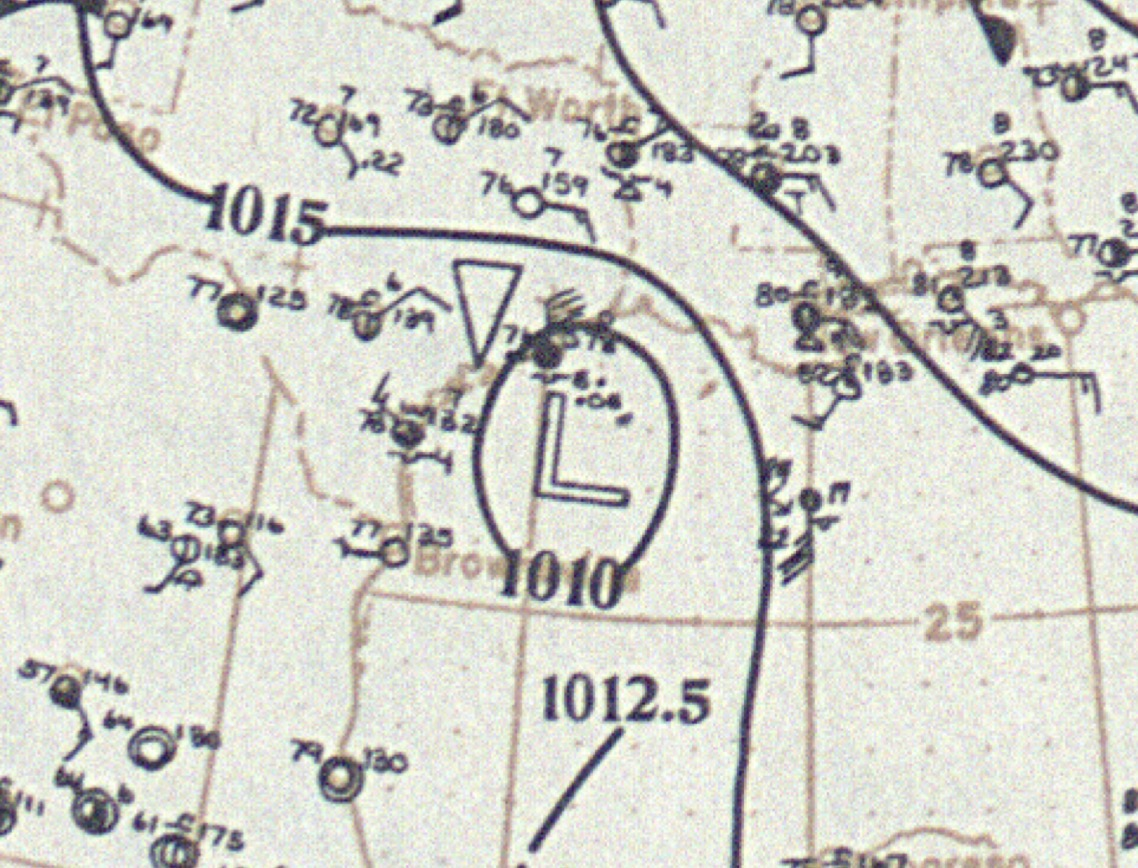
- Surface weather analysis of the hurricane making landfall in Texas at peak intensity on July 21

Meteorological history
- Formed: July 13, 1909
- Dissipated: July 22, 1909

Category 3 major hurricane
- 1-minute sustained (SSHWS/NWS)
- Highest winds: 115 mph (185 km/h)
- Lowest pressure: 959 mbar (hPa); 28.32 inHg

Overall effects
- Fatalities: 41 total
- Damage: $2 million (1909 USD)
- Areas affected: Jamaica, Cuba, Louisiana and Texas
- IBTrACS
- Part of the 1909 Atlantic hurricane season

The 1909 Velasco hurricane was an intense tropical cyclone that devastated areas of the Texas coast in July 1909. The fourth tropical storm, second hurricane, and first major hurricane of the season, it formed from an area of disturbed weather east of the Leeward Islands on July 13, 1909. Remaining weak for much of its early existence, the system began to intensify after nearing Jamaica. Curving towards the northwest, it reached hurricane strength on July 18 near the western tip of Cuba. Intensification stalled as it moved westwards across the Gulf of Mexico, but resumed as the hurricane approached the Texas coast. The storm intensified to a major hurricane on July 21 and subsequently reached its peak intensity with winds of 115 mph (185 km/h) prior to making landfall near Velasco, Texas. Once over land, the system began to quickly weaken, and dissipated near the Rio Grande on July 22.

The hurricane caused 41 deaths and $2 million in damages, (Note: All damage totals are in 1909 United States dollars unless otherwise noted.) all of which were in Texas. Strong waves caused several offshore shipping incidents, and storm surge inundated areas of the Texas coast, though damage in Galveston was mostly mitigated by the Galveston Seawall. In Velasco, only eight buildings remained intact after the hurricane. Strong winds forced train closures and destroyed and downed various infrastructure. Heavy rains further inland peaked at 8.5 in (220 mm) in Hallettsville.

== Meteorological history ==
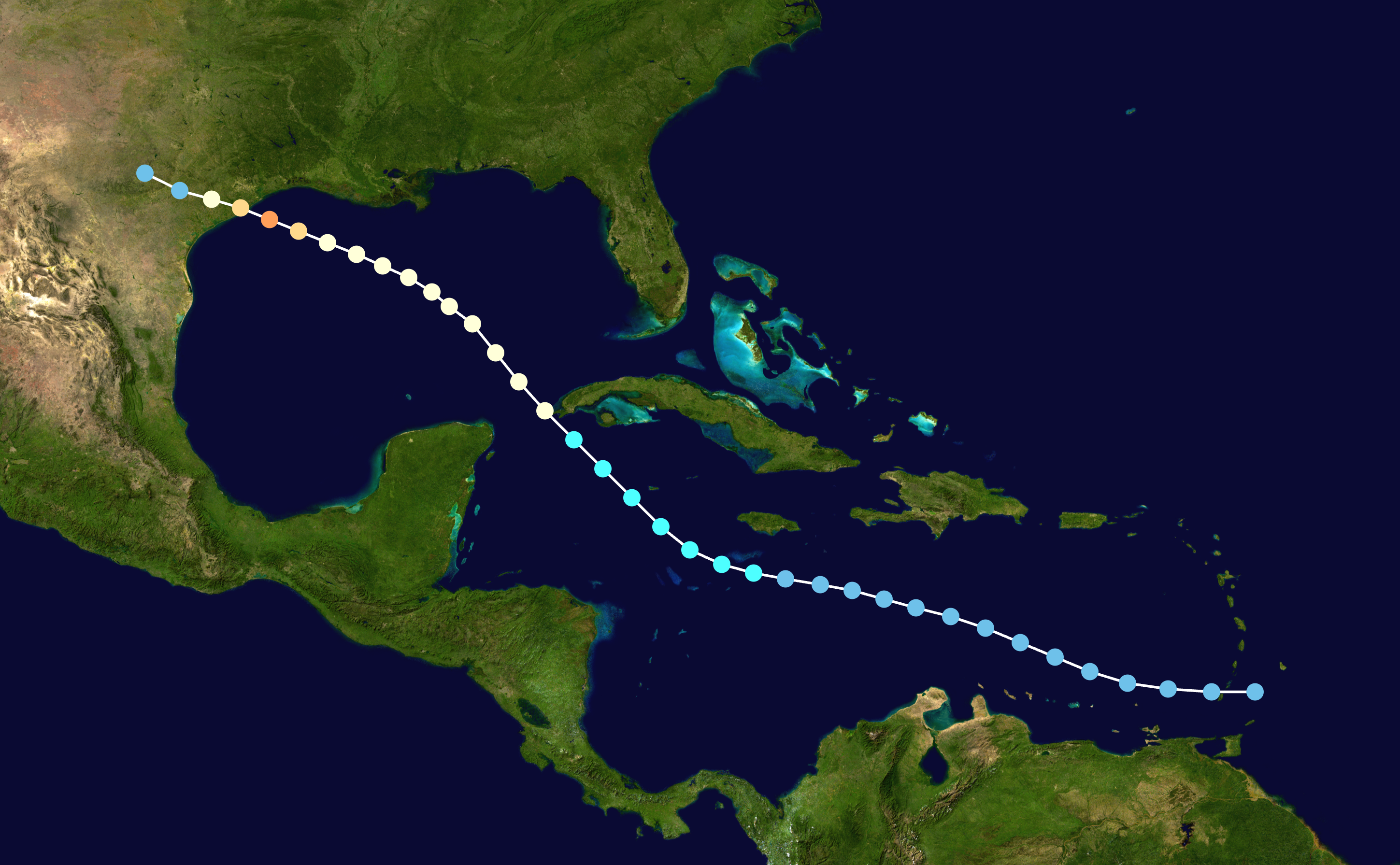
Map plotting the storm's track and intensity, according to the Saffir–Simpson scale Map key Saffir–Simpson scale Tropical depression (≤38 mph, ≤62 km/h) Tropical storm (39–73 mph, 63–118 km/h) Category 1 (74–95 mph, 119–153 km/h) Category 2 (96–110 mph, 154–177 km/h) Category 3 (111–129 mph, 178–208 km/h) Category 4 (130–156 mph, 209–251 km/h) Category 5 (≥157 mph, ≥252 km/h) Unknown Storm type Tropical cyclone Subtropical cyclone Extratropical cyclone, remnant low, tropical disturbance, or monsoon depression

A tropical depression was first noted at 1200 UTC on July 13, northeast of Grenada in the Windward Islands, with winds of 35 mph (55 km/h), though whether it had a closed circulation at the time remains unclear. Nonetheless, the system remained a weak tropical depression for much of its early existence as it moved to the west-northwest through the eastern Caribbean Sea. Weather reports throughout the Caribbean during this time were sparse and according to José Partagás, a former meteorologist at the National Hurricane Center, the system still may have not formed a closed circulation. This meant that the low was not classifiable, though the lack of data also meant that there was no evidence to support this claim and the system was kept as a tropical depression in HURDAT, the Atlantic Hurricane Database. However, once the depression was located south of Jamaica, it began to slowly strengthen and curve more towards the northwest, reaching tropical storm intensity by 0000 UTC on July 17. At the time, the system was expected to make landfall on the Yucatán Peninsula. Ships in the vicinity of the storm reported strong breezes associated with low barometric pressure. Despite predictions, the system curved from its initial west-northwest movement and more towards the northwest, towards the central Gulf of Mexico. The tropical storm continued to intensify, attaining hurricane strength as a Category 1 hurricane on the Saffir–Simpson Hurricane Scale at 1800 UTC on July 18 after skirting past the Guanahacabibes Peninsula.

Once in the Gulf of Mexico, intensification substantially lessened as the storm maintained its Category 1 intensity throughout July 19 and July 20. The hurricane curved in the gulf back to a more westerly direction, while moving at about 10 mph (15 km/h). A minimum pressure reading of 985 mbar (hPa; 29.09 inHg) was reported offshore south of Louisiana by the ship S.S. Paraguay at 1800 UTC on July 20. Strengthening resumed late on July 20th as the hurricane tracked almost parallel to the Louisiana coastline towards Texas. On July 21st, the storm attained its peak intensity as a modern-day Category 3 major hurricane, with sustained winds of 115 mph (185 km/h) and a barometric pressure of 959 mbar (hPa; 28.32 inHg). Later the same day, the hurricane made landfall at this intensity almost directly over Velasco, Texas, with maximum wind speeds stretching 22 mi (35 km) from the hurricane's center. Over the following 24 hours, the system rapidly weakened over land and lost tropical characteristics near the Rio Grande during the afternoon of July 22.

== Preparations and impact ==
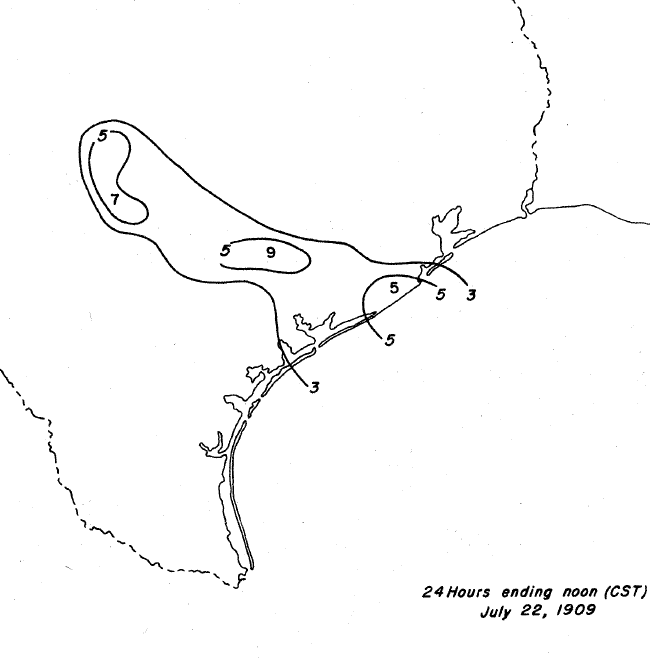
Rainfall totals on July 22

As the hurricane approached Texas, the Weather Bureau issued hurricane warnings for potentially affected areas beginning on July 18. Ships and ports were also continuously notified on the oncoming storm, which helped to keep offshore shipping accidents to a minimum. Inland, as a precautionary measure, rail operations along the coast were halted for a duration of the storm's passage.

At its landfall in Velasco, the hurricane caused a wide swath of damage along the Texas coast and areas further inland. Despite previously issued warnings, rough seas produced by the hurricane still caused several ship accidents. Strong waves forced several ships near Galveston to either become grounded or sunk. The derrick barge Miller and other craft were grounded along Galveston's West Bay. A large dredge was swept into the Galveston Causeway, snapping telegraph cables that ran along the length of the causeway.

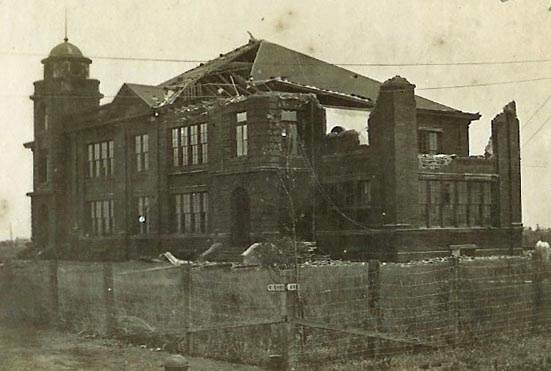
Damage to Jeff Davis High School

The Miriam was sunken by a submerged log, while the schooner Ed Gibbs was broken into pieces near La Porte. The steamboat El Siglo (The Century) remained stranded offshore for twelve hours in winds estimated at 90 mph (145 km/h). Off of Mobile, Alabama, the high waves prevented ships from entering the Port of Mobile. Closer to the coast, the hurricane produced a storm surge of 10 ft (3.0 m) in Galveston and Velasco. However, due to the Galveston Seawall, much of the potential storm surge-related damage in Galveston was mitigated, though the seawall forced spray to rise 60 ft (18 m) in the air. Areas outside the seawall on the Galveston beach, including two fishing piers and pavilions were destroyed. On Galveston's Tarpon Pier, ten members of a fishing party perished after the pier collapsed, though six were rescued by the yacht Mayflower. In western areas of Galveston, where there was no seawall, inland areas were inundated under 7 ft (2.1 m) of water. However, Galveston's primary streets were submerged to a lesser extent, under 2 ft (0.61 m) of water. In Velasco, the tide was reported to have been 3 ft (0.91 m) higher than during the 1900 Galveston hurricane, which inundated the city under 4 ft (1.2 m) of water. Areas of Sabine Pass were also inundated by the high waves, and the Southern Pacific Railroad was submerged in water.

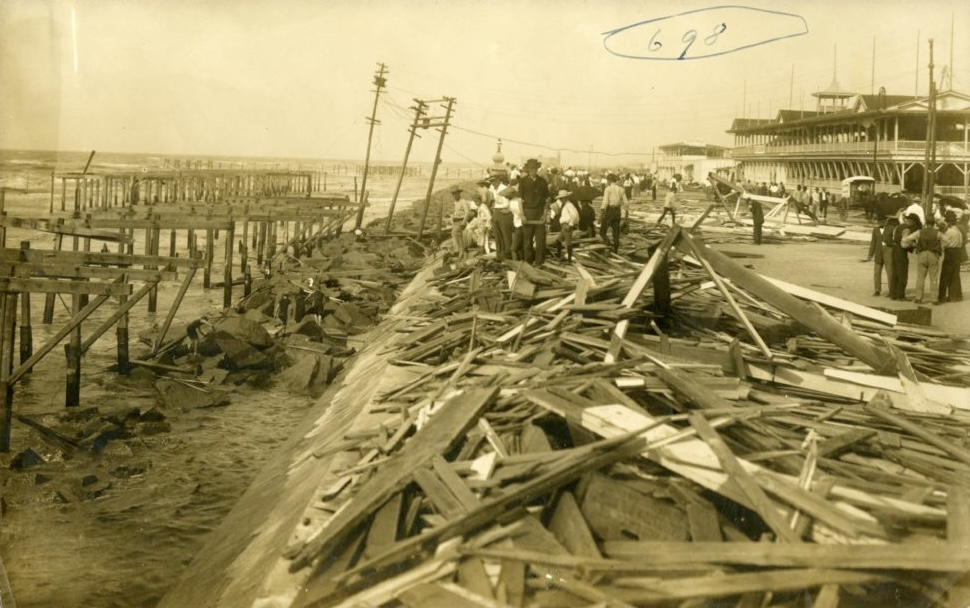
Damage in Galveston after the hurricane

In Velasco, where the hurricane made landfall, only eight buildings remained intact after the storm's passage. Quintana, Columbus, and Columbia were also heavily affected, with all houses experiencing some form of severe damage. In Austin, homes were unroofed, and the storm was considered as the worst hurricane to affect Austin at the time. Heavy rains caused large amounts of driftwood to float down the Colorado River. In Austin, the driftwood struck the newly constructed Congress Avenue Bridge, carrying away 200 ft (61 m) of trestle and resulting in $10,000 in damages. Other cities also reported severely damaged homes and businesses. Galveston suffered minor damage, with reports of chimney damage and broken windows. Three sections of the Galveston Causeway were blown down by the strong winds.

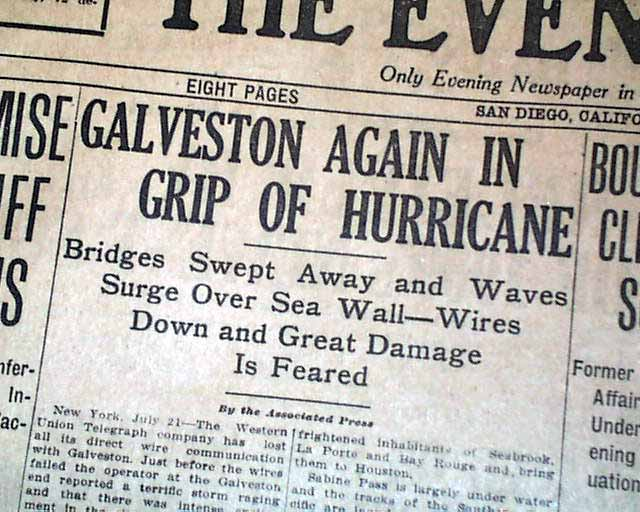
Front page of The Evening Tribune on July 21, discussing the impact of the hurricane in Galveston

As a result, tug boats were forced to carry people and cargo to and from Galveston along West Bay. The Western Union Telegraph Company reportedly lost all direct communication with Galveston for a temporary period of time. Other telegraph companies in Dallas and Chicago also lost communications with the city. Property damage in Galveston was estimated at $100,000. Strong winds and gusts from the storm were reported as far inland as Eagle Pass. The winds uprooted trees and extensively damaged various crops, as well as downed power lines. In the Galveston Jetty, Rosenburg, and Brazoria, strong winds blew trains off of their tracks. Train stations and train depots along the coast also experienced considerable damage, with some depots being completely leveled. Maize fields which had been previously burned by wildfires caused by an ongoing drought in Kingsville were swept down, while cotton crops withstood the hurricane well. Oil derricks near Markham were blown down, and water wells were stripped of their machinery. In Alvin, barns and windmills were destroyed. Richmond also reported destroyed barns, as well as downed chimneys. Six prisoners escaped from the city's local jail after windows were blown in. Rice mills were downed in Eagle Pass.

Damage was comparatively light in Louisiana. Heavy rains and storm surge inundated marshes, resulting in hundreds of reported cattle drownings. Cotton crops from Grand Chenier, Louisiana to Sabine Pass was destroyed by the rains and wind. Two deaths in Louisiana were reported in Cameron Parish, Louisiana.

Further inland, the hurricane produced heavy rainfall in many areas, peaking at 8.5 in (220 mm) in Hallettsville, Texas, with rainfall totals of at least 3 in (76 mm) common in along the hurricane's track. Boerne, Fredericksbrug, and Columbia all set monthly records for 24‑hour rainfall totals on July 21 and 22, with all three cities reporting totals of 5 in (130 mm) or greater. While the heavy rains caused damage in areas, it provided beneficial drought relief in other regions.

== See also ==
- 1915 Galveston hurricane
- 1932 Freeport hurricane
- List of Texas hurricanes (1900–49)
