= Goodrich High School =

Goodrich High School may refer to:

- Goodrich High School (Texas)
- Goodrich High School (Michigan) - Goodrich Area Schools
- Goodrich High School (North Dakota) - Goodrich School District 16 (closed in 2020)
- Goodrich High School, Fond du Lac, Wisconsin, was replaced by Fond du Lac High School in 2001
