= Goodrich School District =

Goodrich School District or Goodrich Public Schools may refer to:

- Goodrich Area Schools (Michigan)
- Goodrich Public School District 16 (North Dakota)
- Goodrich Independent School District (Texas)
