= 1949 Atlantic hurricane season =

- Season summary map

Seasonal boundaries
- First system formed: August 14, 1949
- Last system dissipated: November 5, 1949

Strongest storm
- Name: "Florida"
  - Maximum winds: 130 mph (215 km/h) (1-minute sustained)
  - Lowest pressure: 954 mbar (hPa; 28.17 inHg)

Seasonal statistics
- Total depressions: 17
- Total storms: 16
- Hurricanes: 7
- Major hurricanes (Cat. 3+): 2
- Total fatalities: 26
- Total damage: $59.8 million (1949 USD)

Related articles
- 1949 Pacific hurricane season; 1949 Pacific typhoon season; 1940s North Indian Ocean cyclone seasons

The 1949 Atlantic hurricane season was the last season that tropical cyclones were not publicly labeled by the United States Weather Bureau. It officially began on June 15, and lasted until November 15. These dates conventionally delimit the period of each year when most tropical cyclones form in the Atlantic basin. The first storm, a tropical depression, developed in the northern Gulf of Mexico on August 14. The final system, Tropical Storm Sixteen, dissipated in the southwestern Caribbean Sea on November 5. It was a fairly active season, featuring 16 tropical storms and seven hurricanes. Two of these strengthened into major hurricanes, which are Category 3 or higher on the Saffir–Simpson hurricane wind scale.

The most significant storm of the season was Hurricane Two. It caused up to $52 million (1949 USD) and two deaths after making landfall in Florida as a Category 4 hurricane. Another storm inflicting severe impact was Hurricane Ten. Striking Texas as a Category 2 hurricane, this storm brought heavy rainfall, strong winds, and storm surge to the state, with damage reaching about $6.7 million. In late September, Hurricane Nine caused 15 deaths and over $1 million in damage in Puerto Rico and Dominican Republic. The third tropical storm caused seven fatalities from drowning on Barbados. Several other systems brought minor impacts to land. Overall, storms during this season caused about $59.8 million in damage and 26 fatalities. This season also had the most active September on record at that time, with seven cyclones attaining tropical storm status. (Note: The current record for September tropical storm formation is 10, set in 2020.)

== Season summary ==
The Atlantic hurricane season officially began on June 15, 1949. However, tropical cyclogenesis did not begin until August 14, about two months after the start of the season. Overall, there were 16 tropical storms, seven of which strengthened into hurricanes. Three of these intensified into major hurricanes, which are Category 3 or higher on the modern day Saffir–Simpson hurricane wind scale (SSHWS). Four hurricanes and three tropical storms made landfall during the season, causing 26 deaths and $59.8 million in damage. The last storm of the season, Tropical Storm Sixteen, dissipated on November 5, about 10 days before the official end of the season on November 15.

Activity began on August 14 with a short-lived tropical depression that developed in the northern Gulf of Mexico and struck the Florida Panhandle, then dissipated the following day. The next system was first observed north of the Lesser Antilles on August 21. The hurricane later threatened the Outer Banks of North Carolina, where it caused two deaths and about $50,000 in damage. By August 23, the Florida hurricane developed near the Lesser Antilles. It later peaked as a low-end Category 4 hurricane on the modern day Saffir–Simpson hurricane wind scale and struck South Florida at that intensity. The storm severely impacted the Florida peninsula and left two deaths and approximately $52 million in losses. On August 30, the third system of the season struck the Leeward Islands, causing some impact and seven deaths by drowning on Barbados. A fourth system was first observed near Puerto Rico on September 3. It peaked as a Category 3 hurricane while passing east on Bermuda. After becoming extratropical, the remnants of this storm struck Newfoundland. Tropical Storm Five also developed on September 3, in the southern Gulf of Mexico and struck Louisiana on September 4. It caused minor damage in Mississippi and Louisiana, totaling less than $50,000.

Neither the sixth or seventh tropical storms impacted land. The eighth hurricane was initially observed in the Gulf of Mexico on September 20. It meandered erratically for several days, until eventually making landfall in Veracruz. The system produced above normal tides and locally heavy rains in Texas and Louisiana. Hurricane Nine was initially spotted near the Leeward Islands on September 20. It struck Dominican Republic on September 22, shortly before dissipating. The storm left over $1 million in damage and 15 deaths in Dominican Republican and Puerto Rico. On September 27, the tenth hurricane developed in the Pacific Ocean offshore Guatemala. The system eventually reached the Gulf of Mexico and struck Texas as a Category 2 hurricane on October 4. The adverse effects of this storm resulted in two deaths and $6.7 million in damage. No impact was reported from the final three storms, the last of which dissipated on November 5.

The season's activity was reflected with an accumulated cyclone energy (ACE) rating of 96. ACE is, broadly speaking, a measure of the power of the hurricane multiplied by the length of time it existed, so storms that last a long time, as well as particularly strong hurricanes, have high ACEs. It is only calculated at every six-hour interval that a tropical cyclone is at or exceeding 39 mph (63 km/h), the threshold for tropical storm intensity.

== Systems ==
=== Tropical depression ===
Historical weather maps began indicating the presence of a tropical wave to the east of the Windward Islands on August 4. Moving westward, the wave reached the Caribbean Sea three days later. The wave had entered the northeastern Gulf of Mexico by August 11, when it spawned a broad low-pressure area. A closed circulation likely formed on August 14, and thus, the wave became a tropical depression. The system soon made landfall in the western Florida Panhandle and dissipated over Alabama by the following day. A thunderstorm wind event associated with the depression produced a sustained wind speed up to 32 mph (51 km/h) in New Orleans, Louisiana.

=== Hurricane One ===
- Category 2 hurricane (SSHWS)
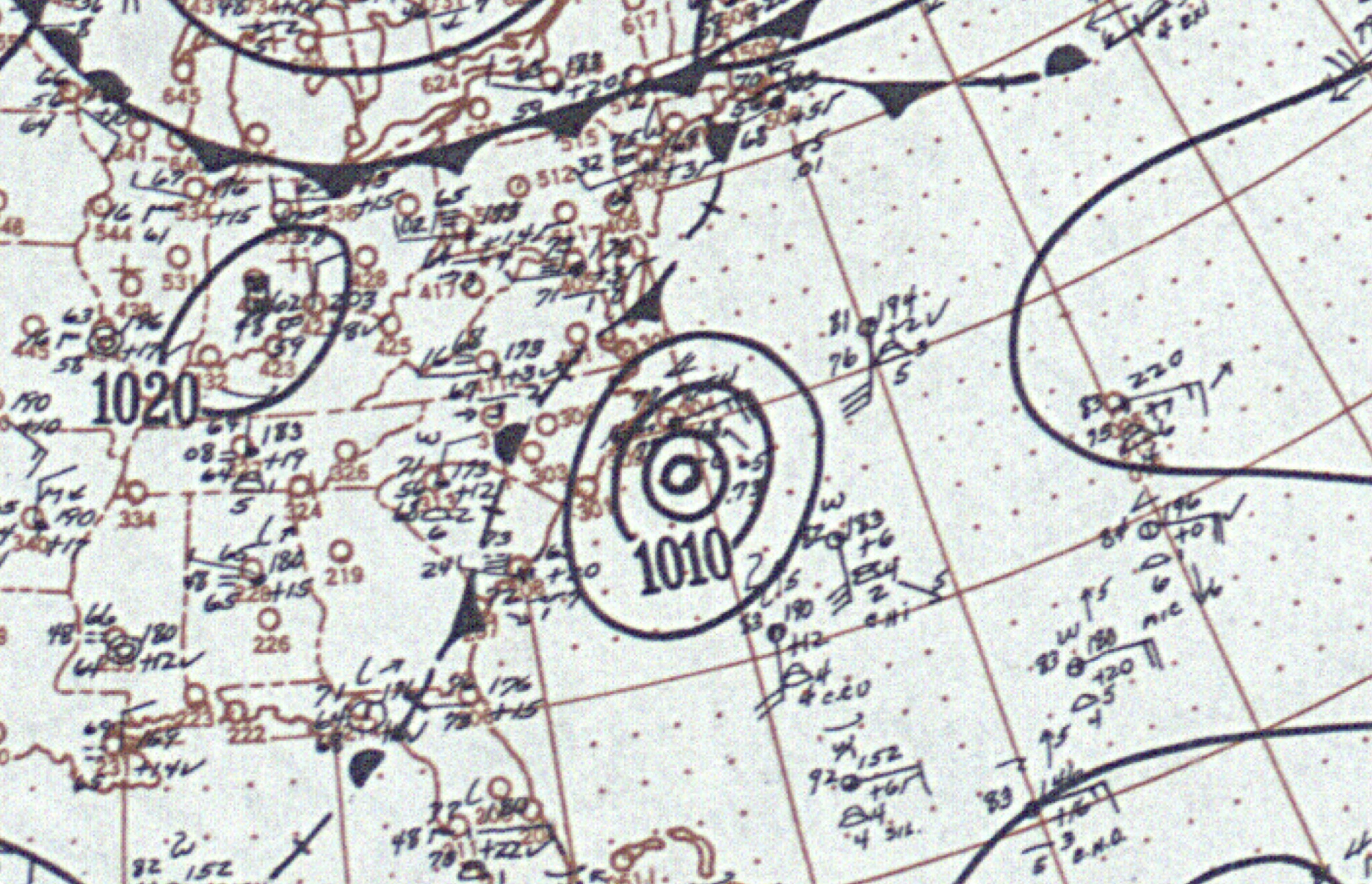
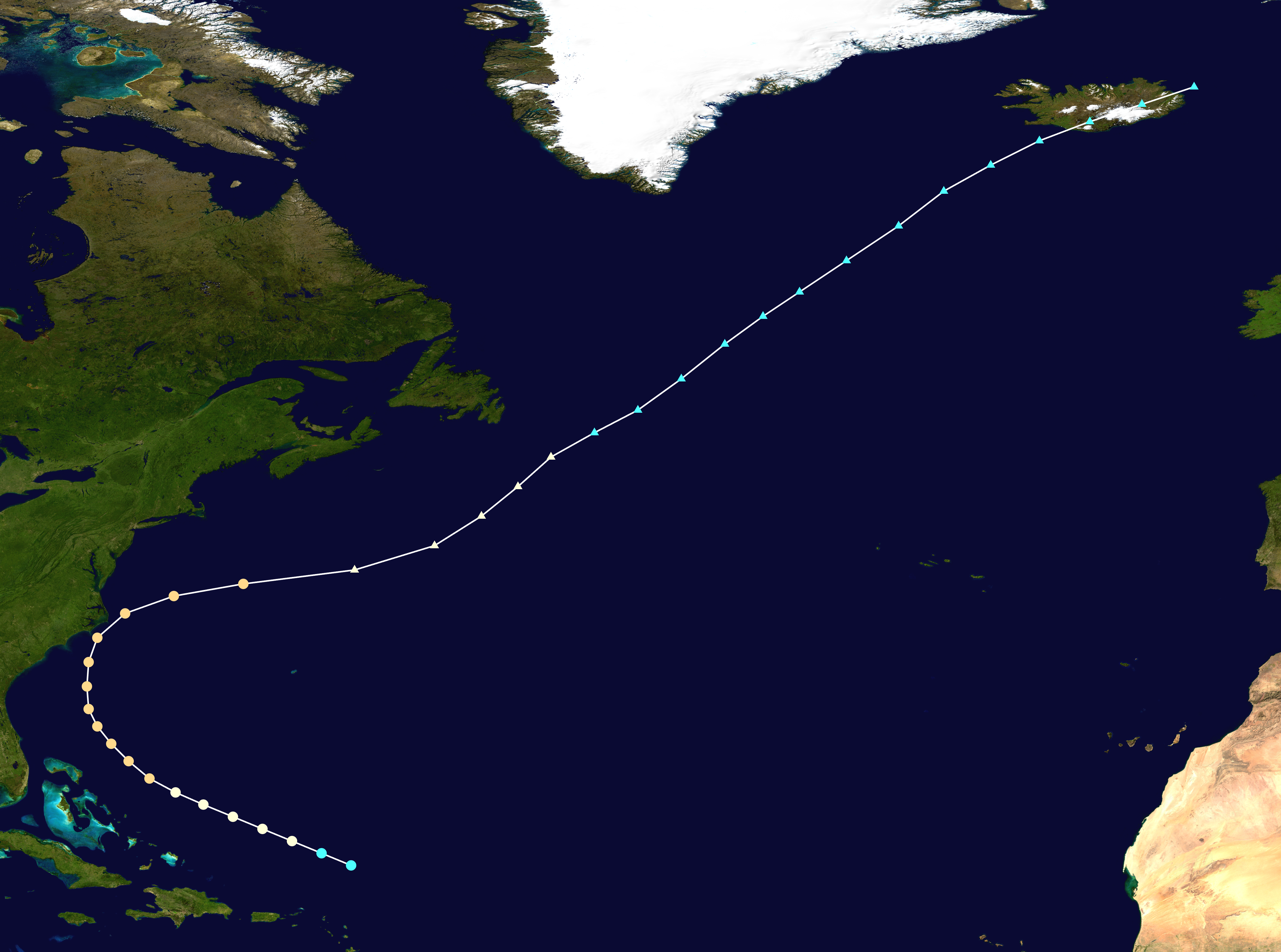
- Duration: August 21 – August 25
- Peak intensity: 110 mph (175 km/h) (1-min); ≤974 mbar (hPa)

A tropical storm was first observed about a few hundred miles north of the Lesser Antilles on August 21. The storm moved west-northwestward and was upgraded to a hurricane 12 hours later, after various surface vessels reported winds of 80 mph (130 km/h). It paralleled The Bahamas and turned northward on August 23. Further intensification continued until August 24, with the storm approaching major hurricane status. At 00:00 UTC it peaked with maximum sustained winds of 110 mph (175 km/h). The eye of the cyclone later passed over the Diamond Shoals Lightship, which recorded a minimum central barometric pressure of 977 mbar (28.9 inHg) while located offshore of Cape Hatteras, North Carolina. The cyclone became extratropical on August 25 and dissipated near Iceland on August 30.

In the Hatteras area, sustained winds reached 73 mph (117 km/h), while rainfall up to 4 in (100 mm) was observed. Thousands of trees were destroyed in Buxton. Damage was estimated at $50,000, mostly in the Buxton area. Additionally, the storm was attributed to two fatalities. Later on August 24, the storm curved east-northeastward and began to slowly weaken. By 00:00 UTC on August 26, it transitioned into an extratropical cyclone while located well south of Newfoundland. It was known as Hurricane Harry in newspapers.

=== Hurricane Two ===
- Category 4 hurricane (SSHWS)
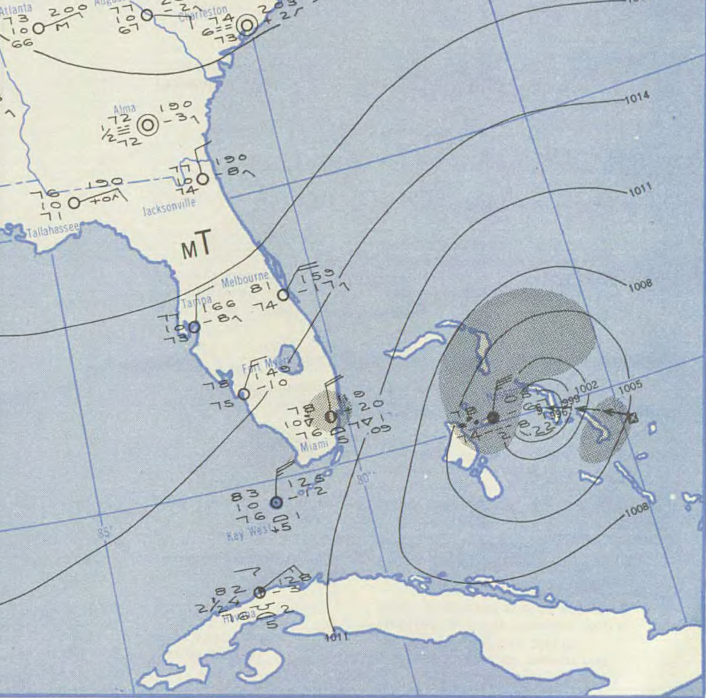
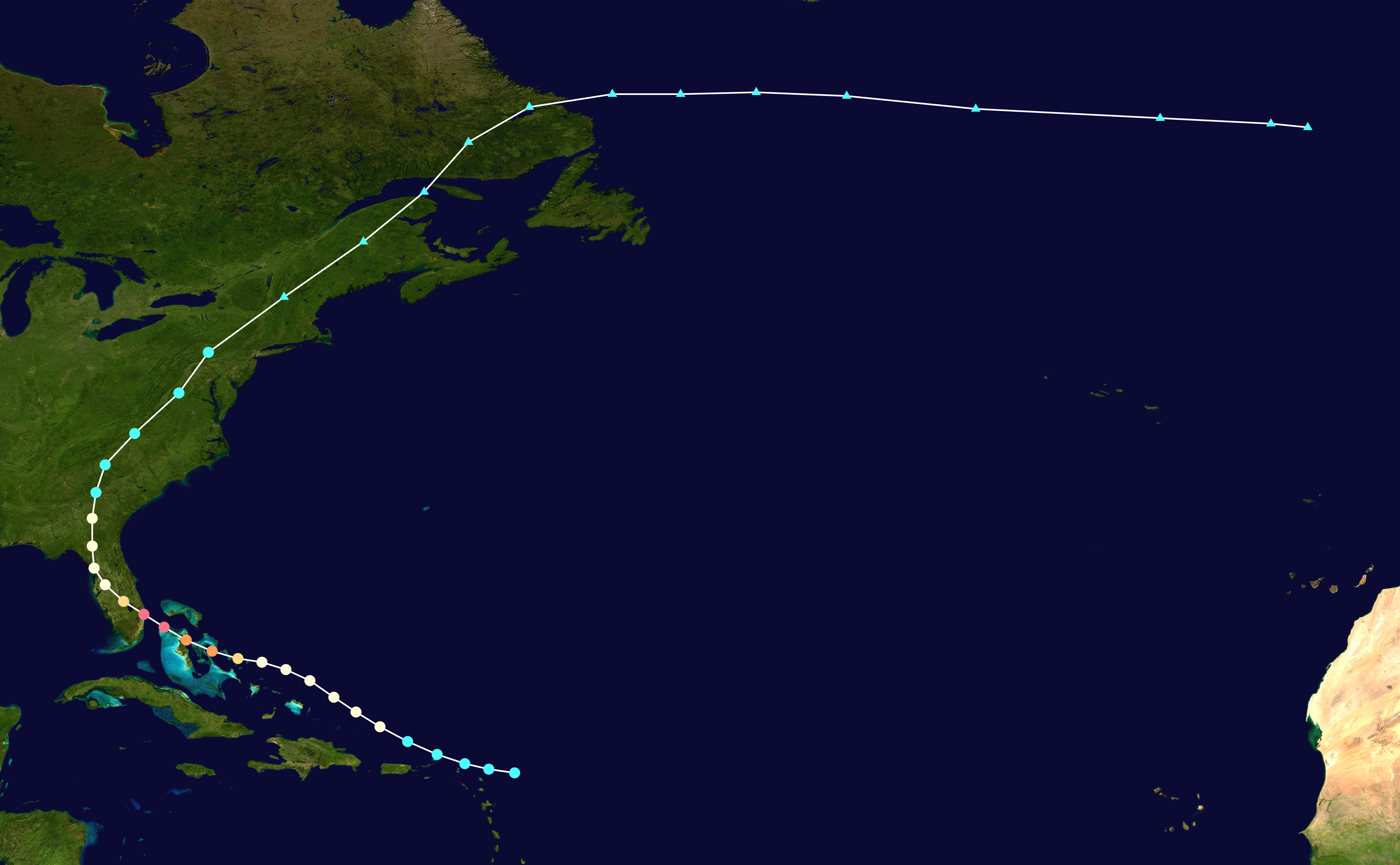
- Duration: August 23 – August 29
- Peak intensity: 130 mph (215 km/h) (1-min); 954 mbar (hPa)

The Florida Hurricane of 1949

A tropical storm developed east of the northernmost Lesser Antilles on August 23. It moved west-northwestward and strengthened, becoming a hurricane on August 24. Moving through the Bahamas, the storm rapidly strengthened over the warm sea surface temperatures of the Gulf Stream. It became a major hurricane on August 26 and then passed just north of Nassau. At 18:00 UTC on that day, it peaked as a Category 4 hurricane with maximum sustained winds of 130 mph (210 km/h). Five hours later, the storm made landfall in Lake Worth, Florida, at the same intensity. On August 27, the hurricane weakened quickly after moving inland over Lake Okeechobee, but otherwise maintained hurricane intensity as it curved northward into southern Georgia. At 00:00 UTC on August 28, it degenerated into a tropical storm. It later ejected northeastward and tracked rapidly across the Southeastern United States, Mid-Atlantic, and New England. On August 29, the storm became extratropical over New Hampshire.

Early in its duration, the cyclone dropped precipitation in the Lesser Antilles. Rains combined with intense thunderstorms caused minor damage to telephone poles and trees, as well as some power outages. In Florida, the storm produced strong winds, with highest official observations being sustained winds of 110 mph (180 km/h) at the Palm Beach International Airport and gusts of 155 mph (250 km/h) in Palm Beach. The most severe damage in South Florida occurred in Palm Beach, Jupiter, and Stuart; hundreds of homes, apartment buildings, stores, and warehouse buildings lost roofs and windows. Interior furnishings were blown through broken glass into the streets. Approximately 90% of homes and buildings were damaged in Stuart, leaving about 500 people homeless. Additionally, heavy rainfall caused water to enter numerous homes in Martin and Palm Beach Counties. Significant damage to crops also occurred, particularly to citrus. In Florida alone, the hurricane caused two deaths and at least $52 million in damage, $20 million of which was to agriculture. Minor impact was reported in other states, with local flooding and light wind damage in Georgia, The Carolinas, and Maryland.

=== Tropical Storm Three ===
- Tropical storm (SSHWS)
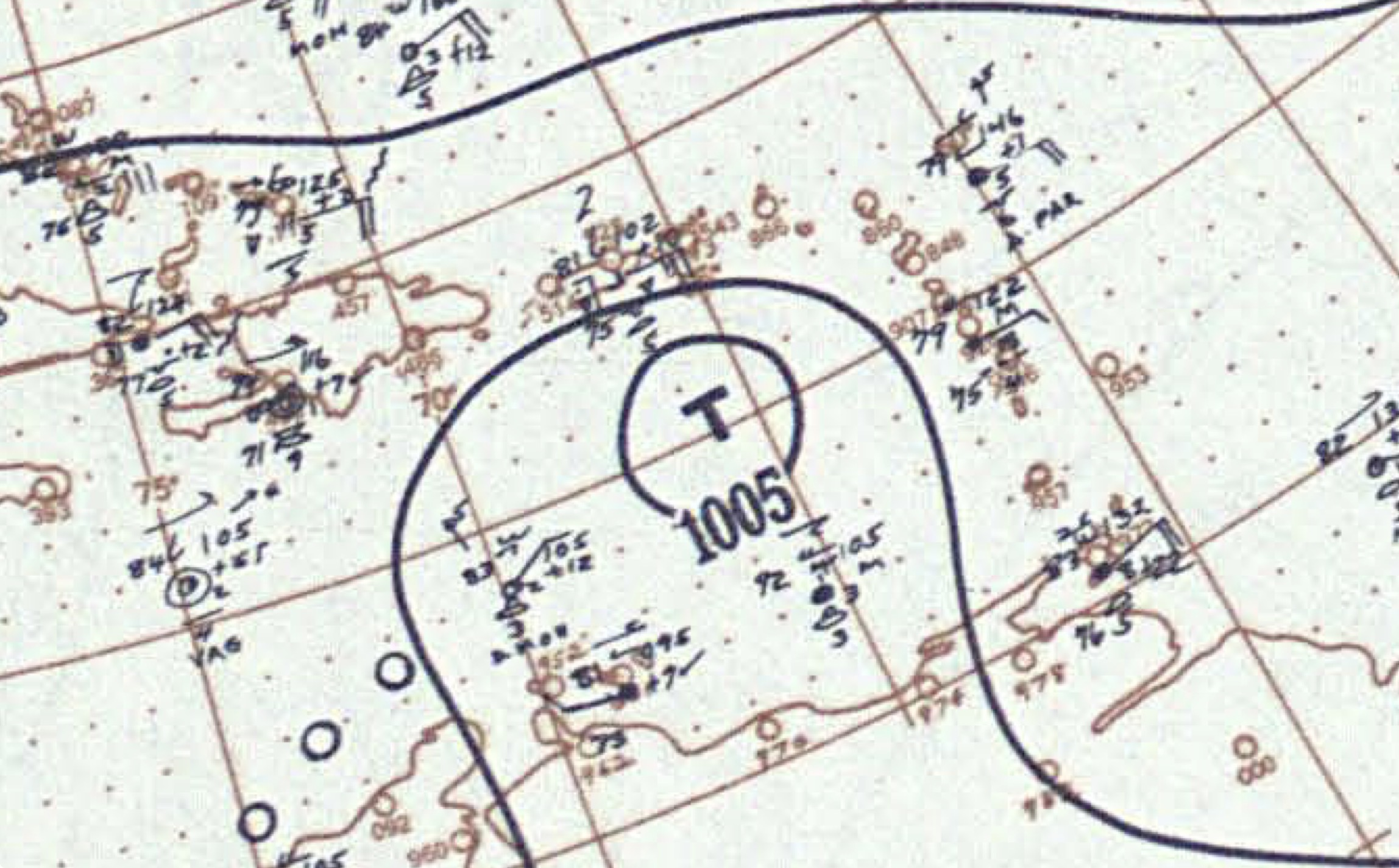
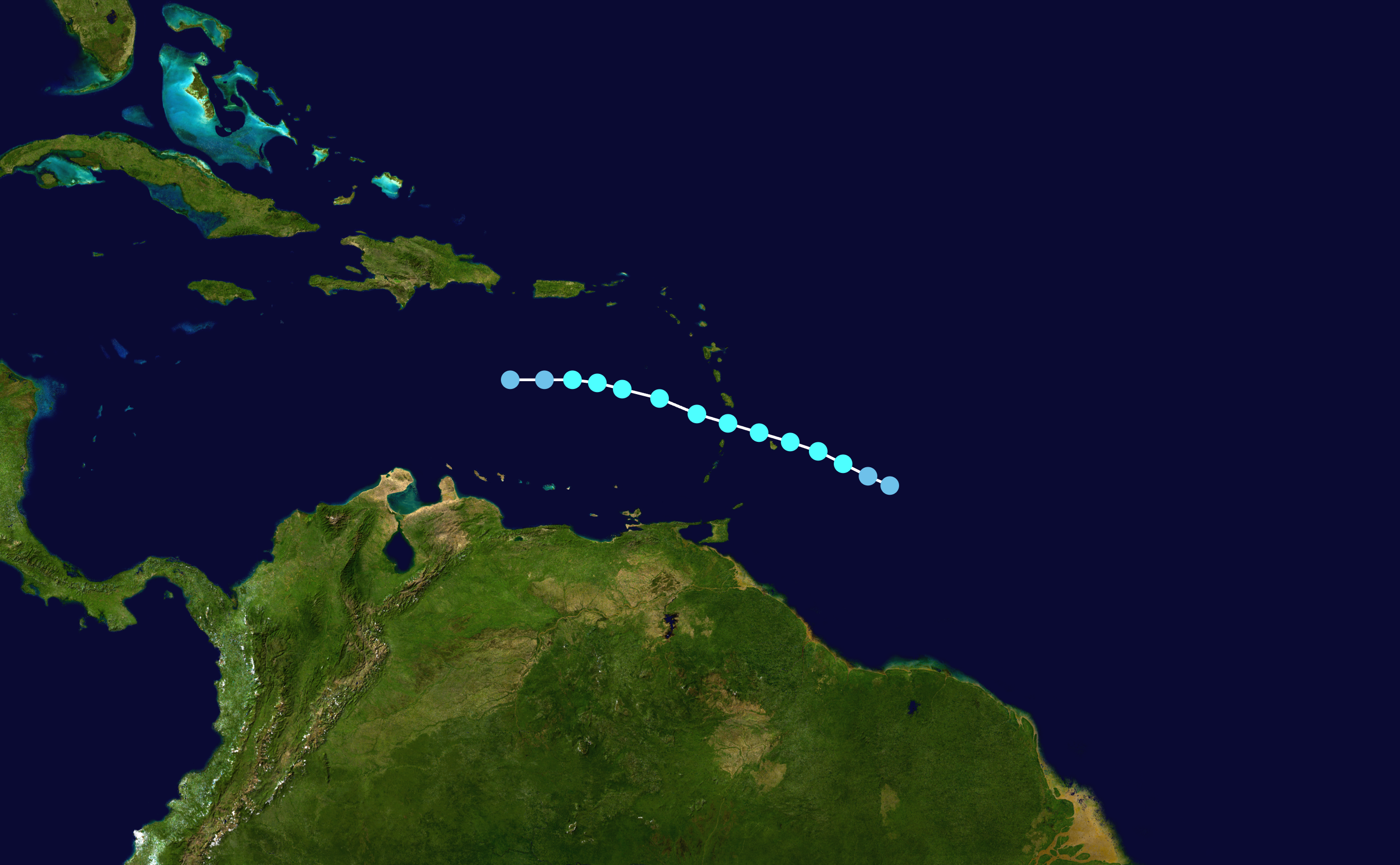
- Duration: August 30 – September 3
- Peak intensity: 45 mph (75 km/h) (1-min); 1005 mbar (hPa)

A tropical depression formed to the east of the Lesser Antilles on August 30. It moved steadily west-northwestward, passing over Barbados as a weak tropical storm. Seven people drowned on the island and 27 houses were destroyed in Bridgetown. On Dominica, winds uprooted some trees, while rough seas damaged roads, jetties, and Landings. After entering the Caribbean Sea on September 1, hostile conditions weakened the storm, and the third tropical cyclone of the season degenerated into a tropical wave on September 3 to the south of the eastern tip of the Dominican Republic.

=== Hurricane Four ===
- Category 3 hurricane (SSHWS)
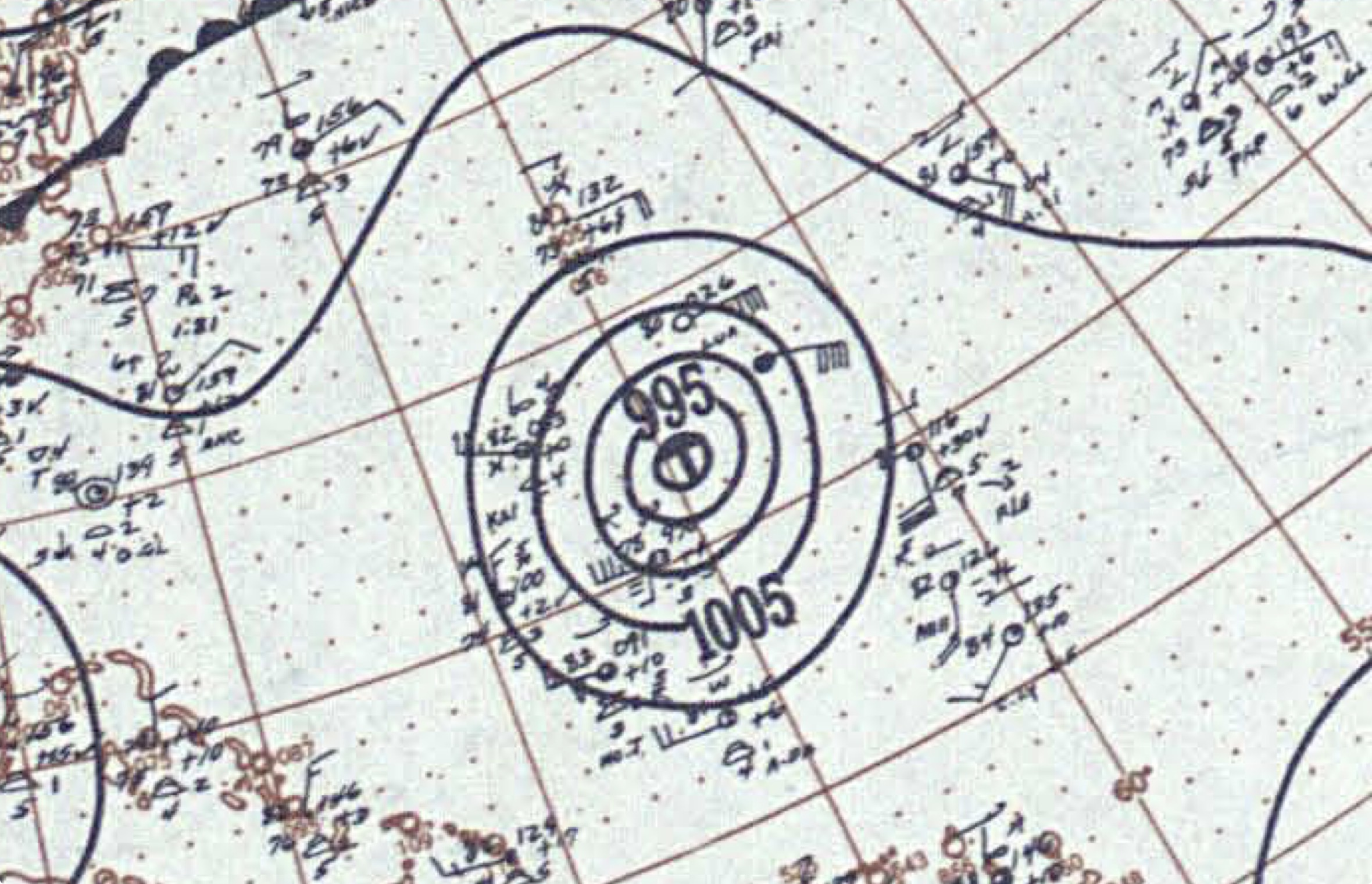
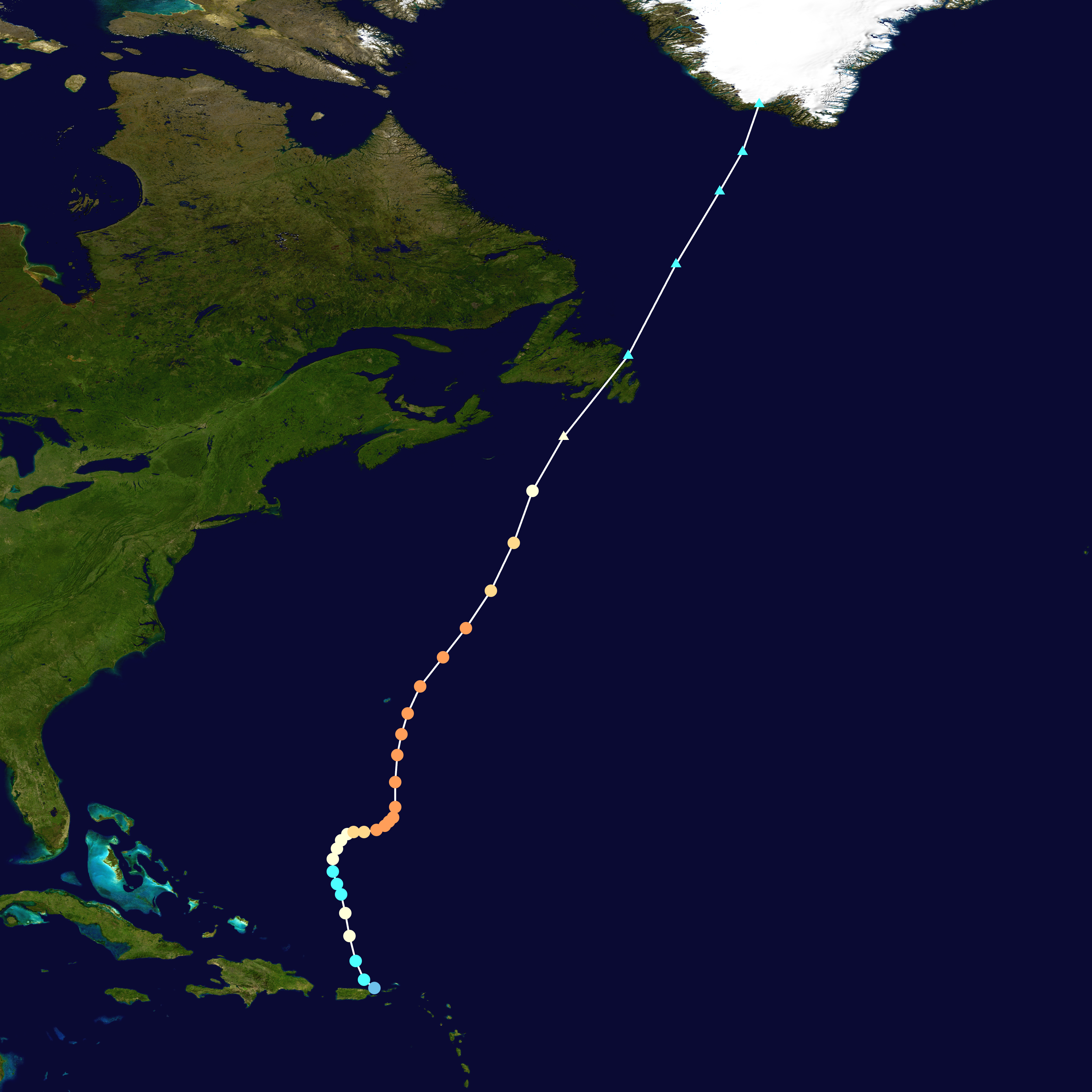
- Duration: September 3 – September 10
- Peak intensity: 125 mph (205 km/h) (1-min); ≤974 mbar (hPa)

A tropical wave developed into a tropical storm east of Puerto Rico on September 3. It moved northward and strengthened to a hurricane later that day, but then weakened to a strong tropical storm the next day. At the same time, the system halted its forward motion and began to drift eastward. Early on September 5, it re-intensified into a hurricane, and it became a major hurricane on September 6. The storm turned to the north on September 7 and passed about 65 mi (105 km) east of Bermuda on September 8. The hurricane weakened as it accelerated northeastward over cooler waters, and became extratropical on September 10 near Atlantic Canada. Shortly after becoming extratropical, it passed over Newfoundland, and ultimately dissipated on September 11 near southwestern Greenland.

The hurricane produced gale-force winds on Bermuda, though overall, no damage was reported. In Newfoundland, the storm brought rainfall up to 2 inches (51 mm) in many areas. The Bayfield was smashed into pieces along the rocky shores, though all of the crewmen swam to safety.

=== Tropical Storm Five ===
- Tropical storm (SSHWS)
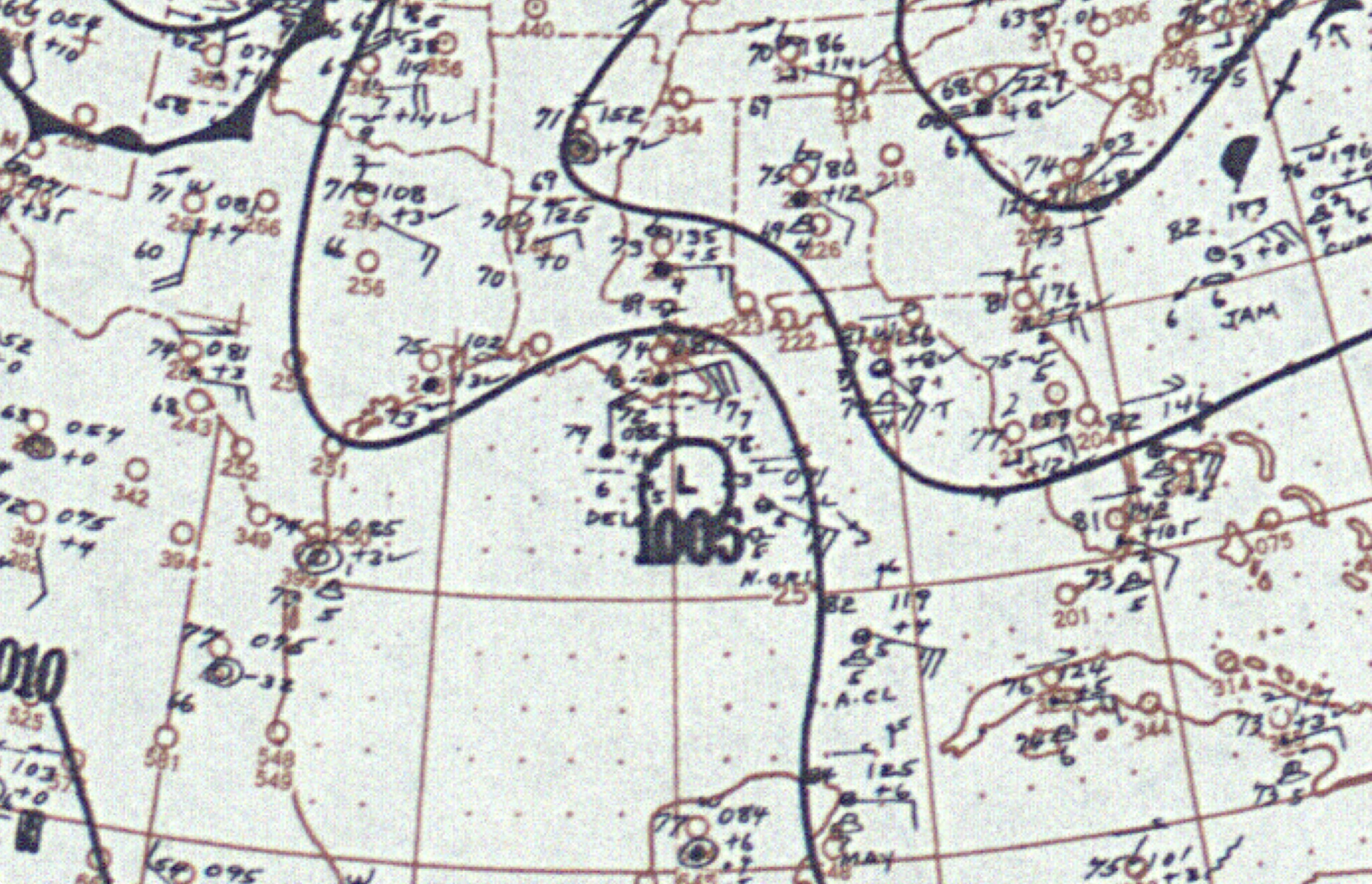
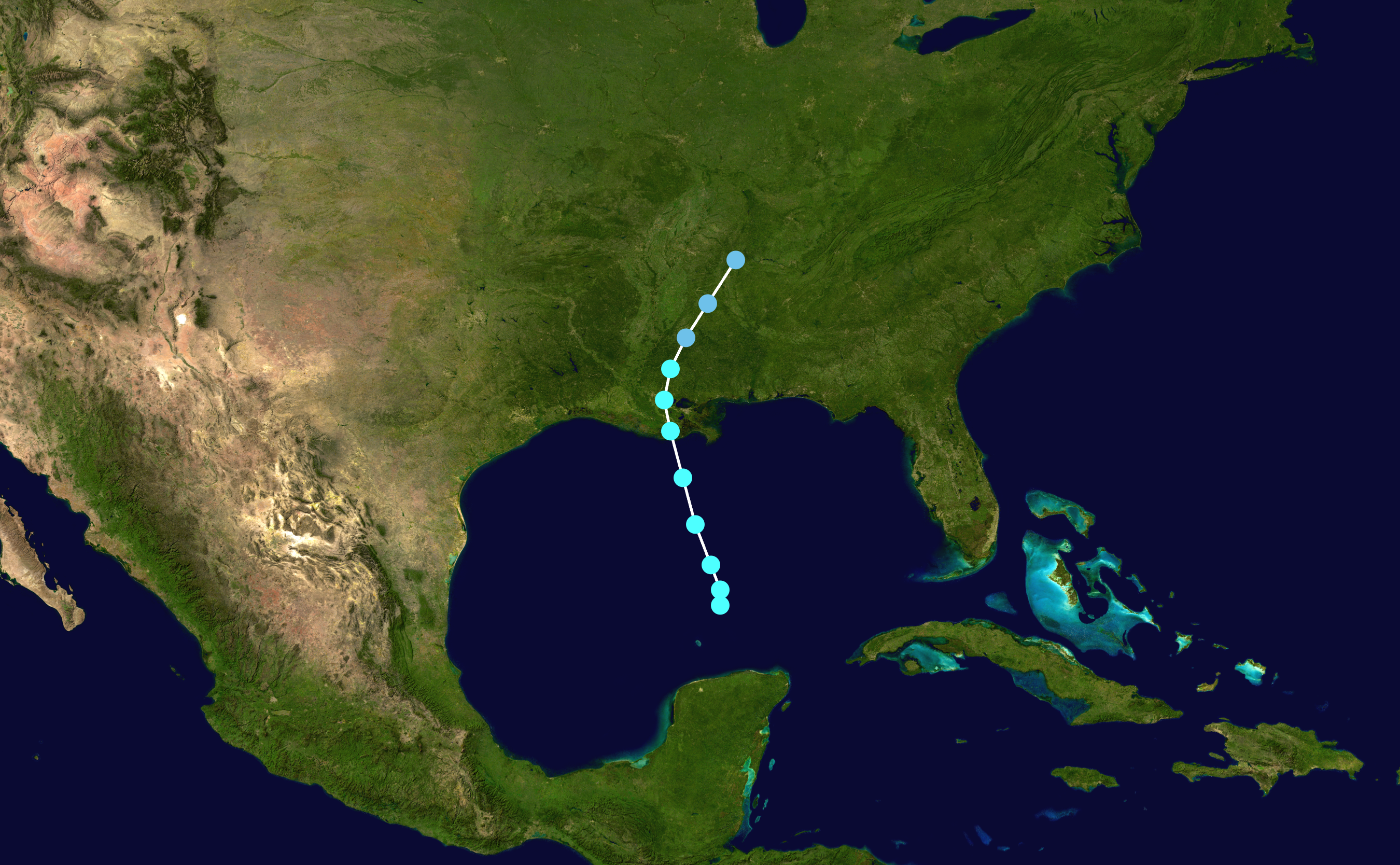
- Duration: September 3 – September 5
- Peak intensity: 60 mph (95 km/h) (1-min); 1000 mbar (hPa)

Early on September 3, a tropical storm developed in the south-central Gulf of Mexico. Throughout much of its duration, the storm headed north-northwestward, gradually intensifying into a moderate tropical storm. At around 12:00 UTC on September 4, the storm made landfall near Cocodrie, Louisiana, while at its peak intensity. While moving inland, it passed west of New Orleans and east of Vicksburg, Mississippi. The storm curved northeastward and slowly weakened across the Southern United States. Late on September 5, it dissipated over Tennessee. Damage was minimal in Louisiana and Mississippi, likely amounting to less than $50,000.

=== Tropical Storm Six ===
- Tropical storm (SSHWS)
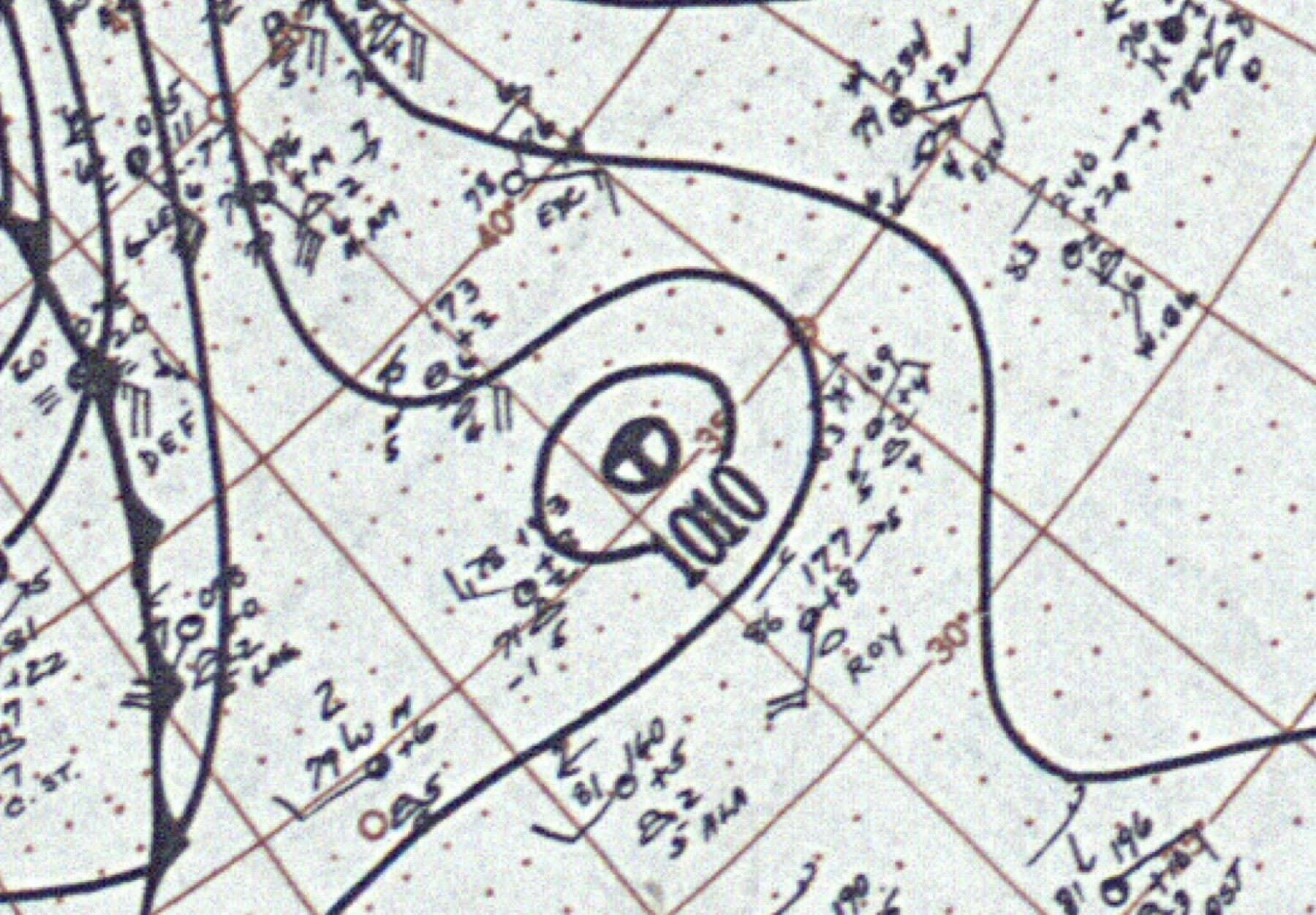
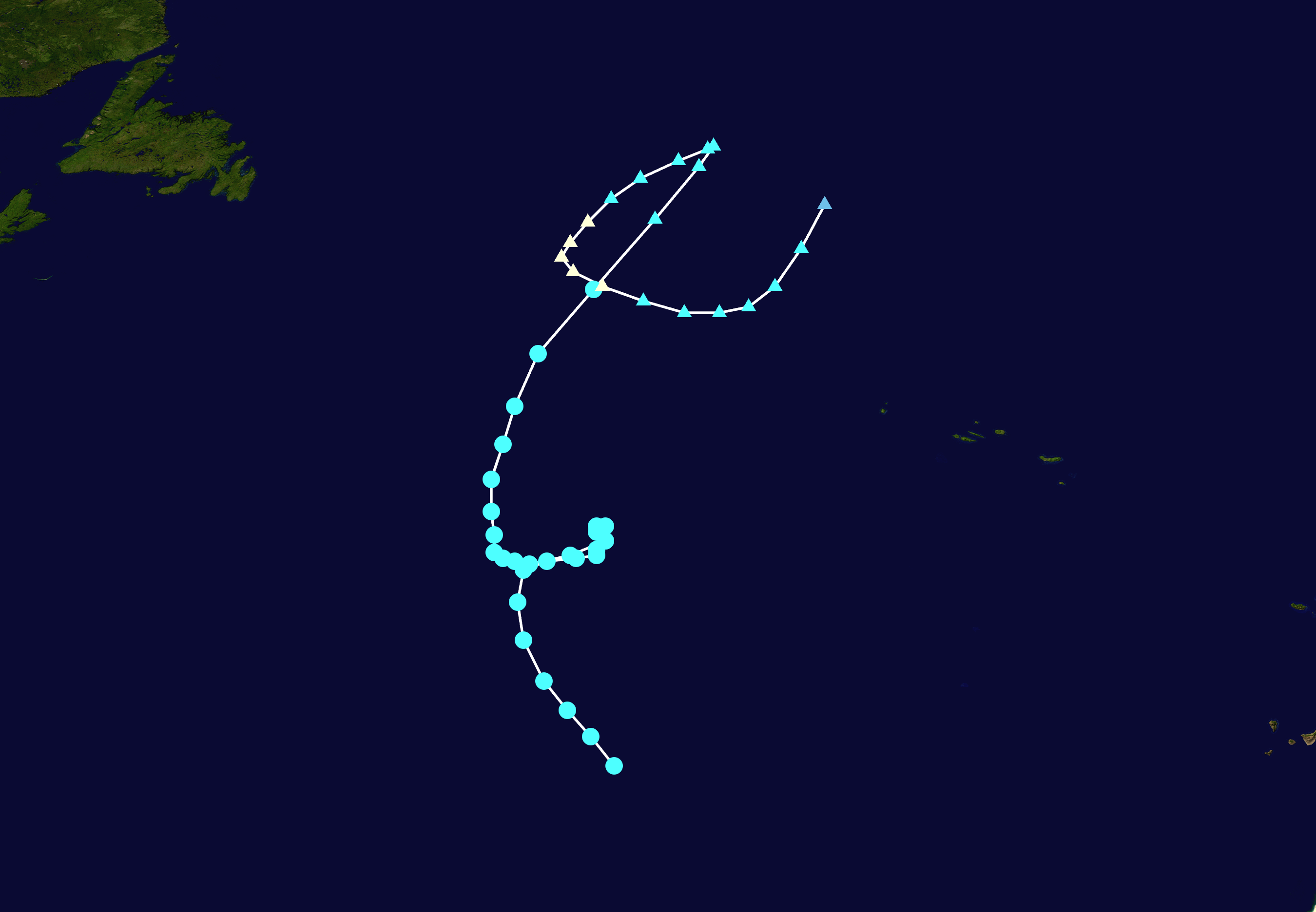
- Duration: September 5 – September 12
- Peak intensity: 65 mph (100 km/h) (1-min); 996 mbar (hPa)

The sixth tropical storm of the season was first observed on September 5, while located about half-way between the northern Lesser Antilles and the Azores. The storm moved to the northwest and reached its peak intensity early on September 12. It then became extratropical, turning to the northeast before curving southeastward. It dissipated on September 16.

=== Tropical Storm Seven ===
- Tropical storm (SSHWS)
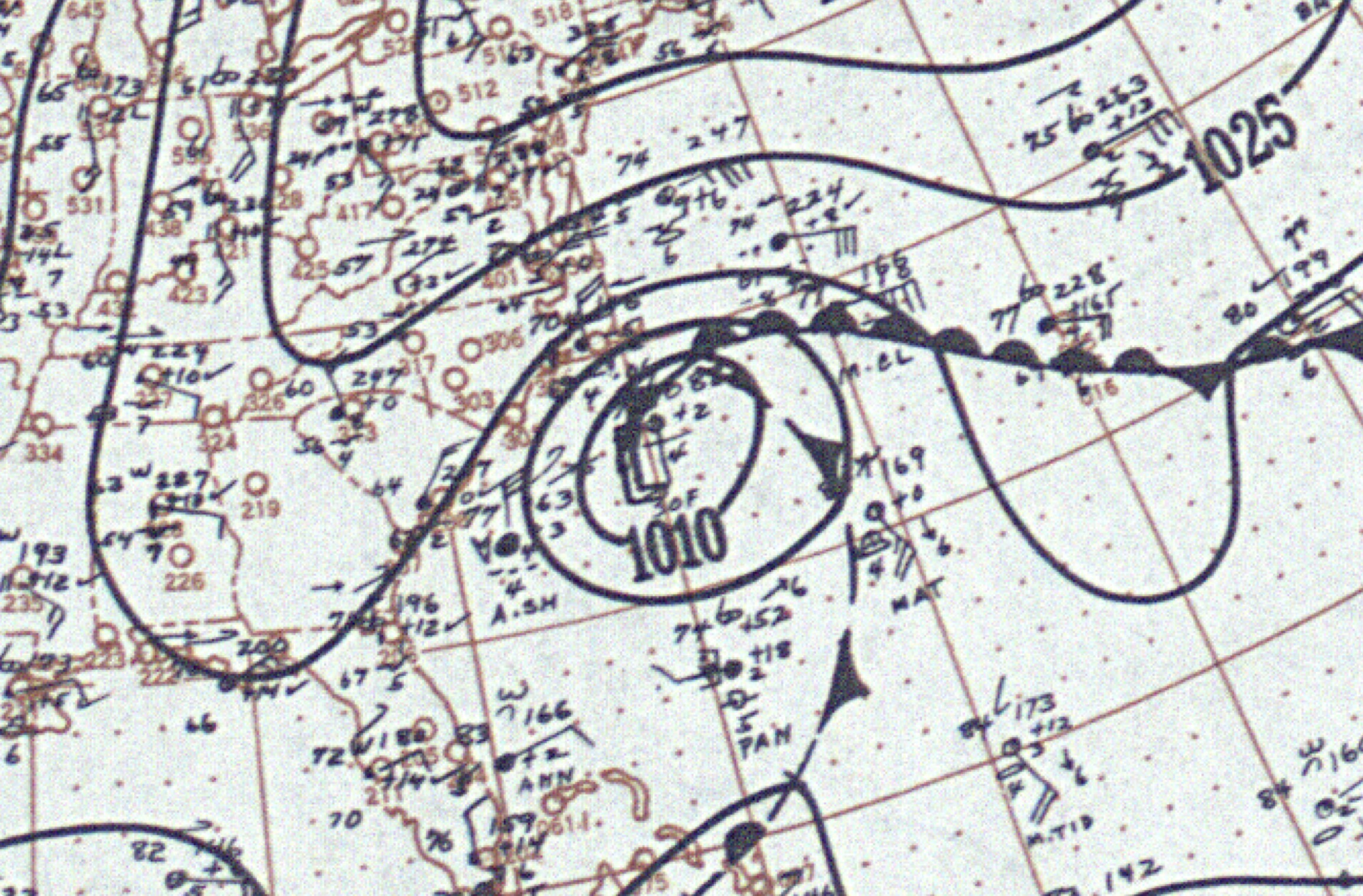
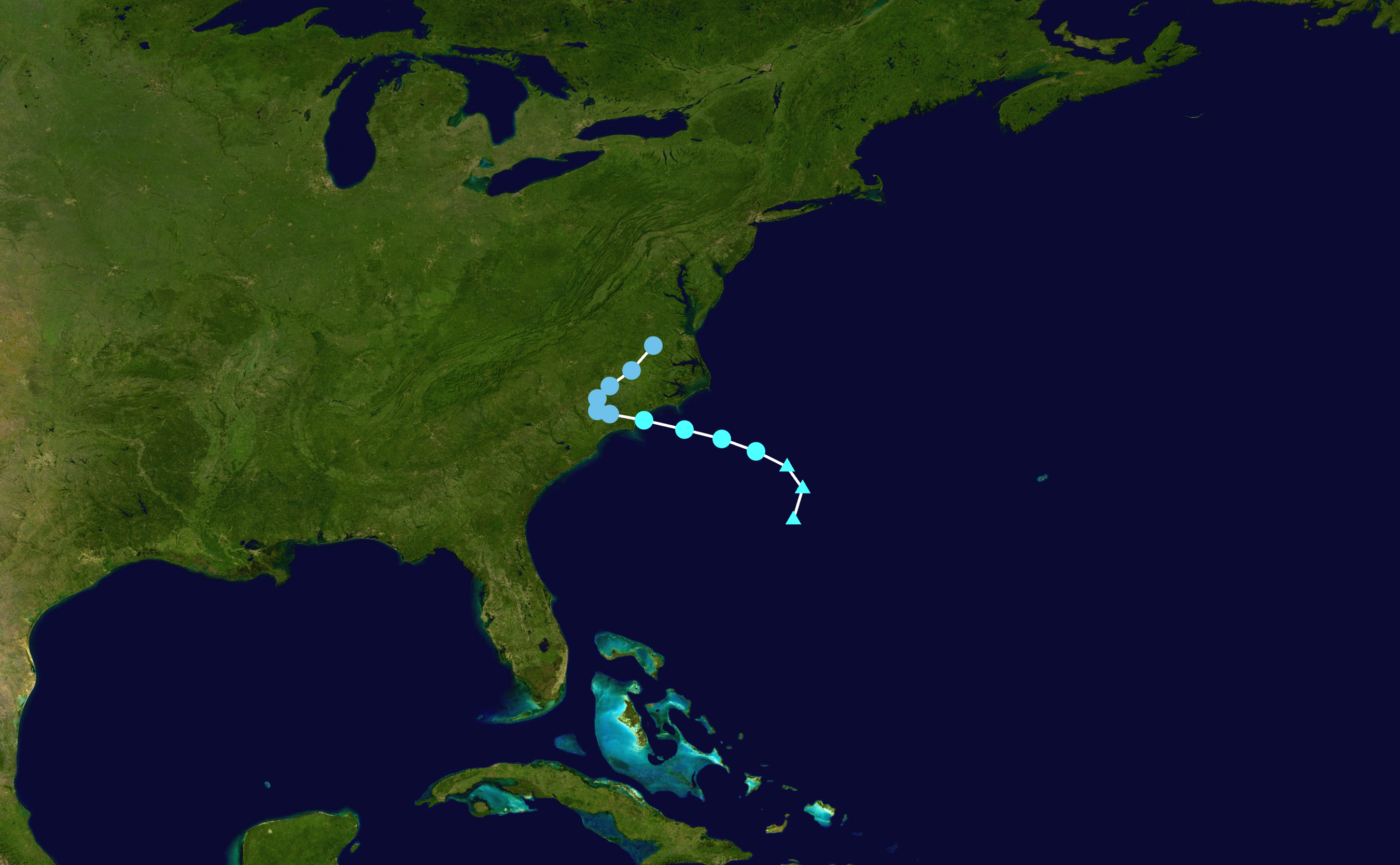
- Duration: September 11 – September 14
- Peak intensity: 50 mph (85 km/h) (1-min); ≤1006 mbar (hPa)

An extratropical system developed into a tropical storm offshore The Carolinas on September 11. The storm moved west-northwestward and strengthened slightly, peaking with winds of 50 mph (85 km/h) and a minimum barometric pressure of 1,006 mbar (29.7 inHg). It then weakened somewhat before making landfall near Wrightsville Beach, North Carolina on September 13 with winds of 40 mph (65 km/h). The storm soon weakened to a tropical depression and curved northeastward. It dissipated over southeastern Virginia on September 14.

=== Tropical Storm Eight ===
- Tropical storm (SSHWS)
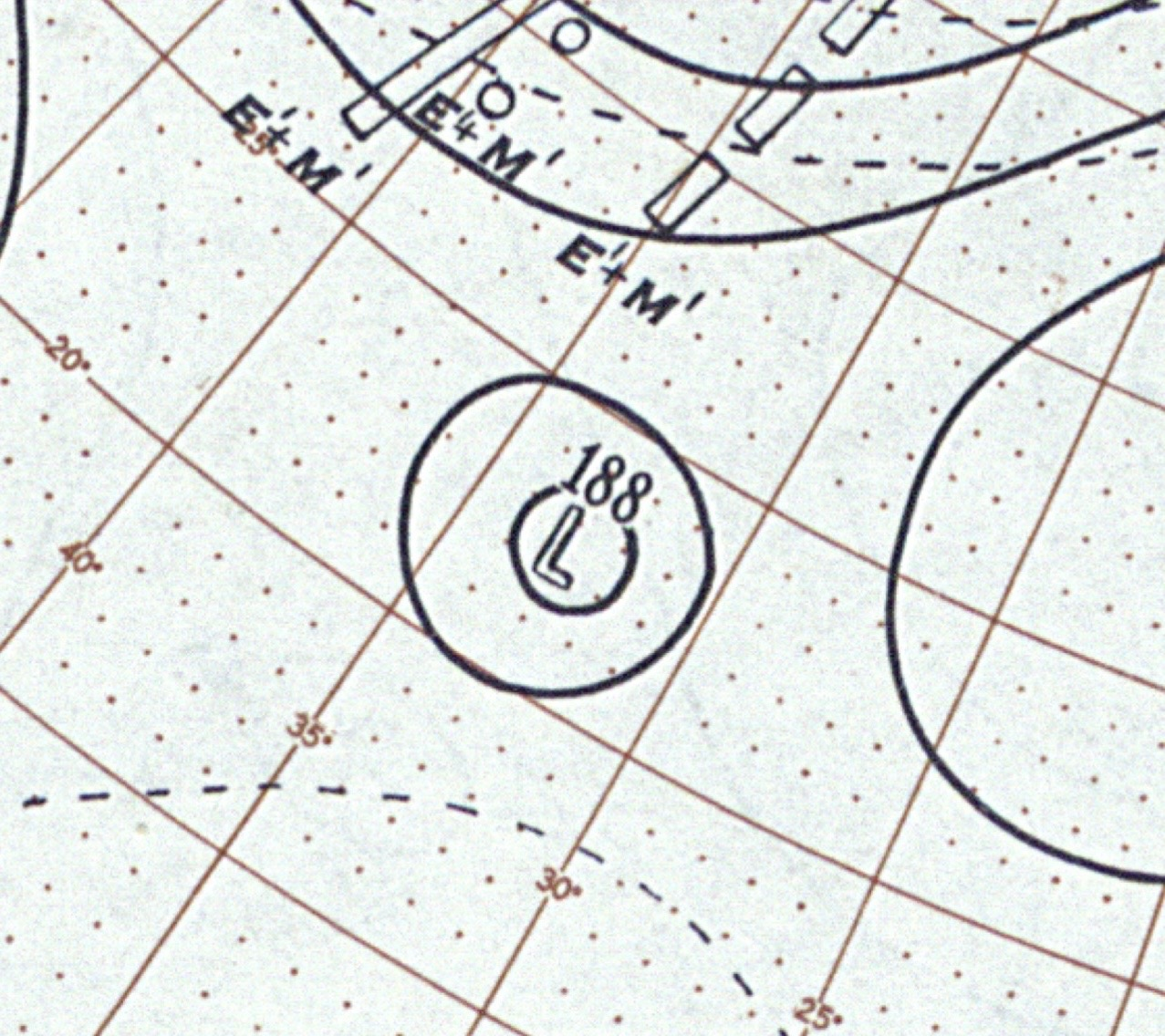
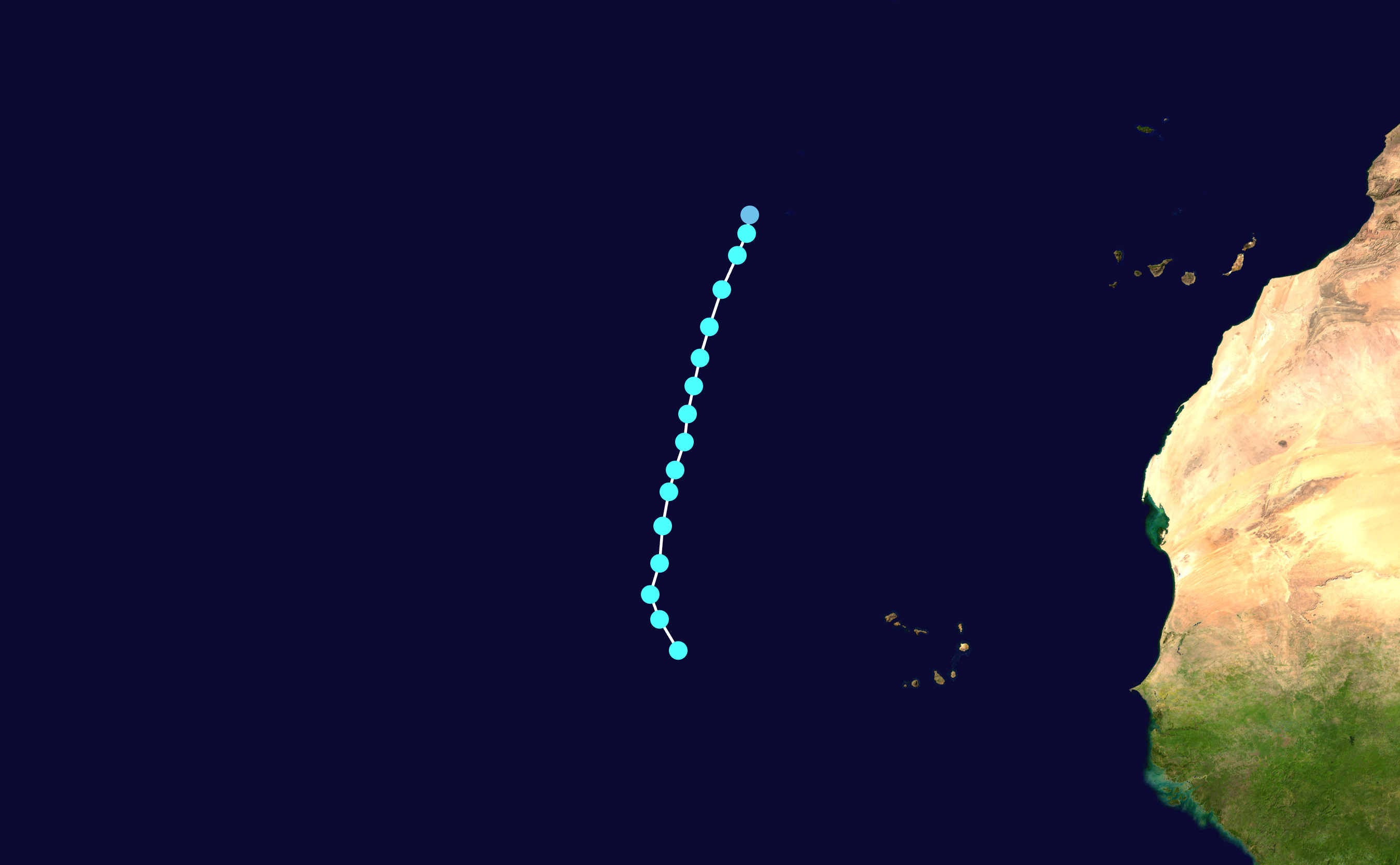
- Duration: September 13 – September 17
- Peak intensity: 60 mph (95 km/h) (1-min); ≤1004 mbar (hPa)

A tropical storm developed early on September 13, while located about 595 miles (960 km) west of the southernmost islands of Cape Verde. The storm slowly strengthened while moving north-northeastward across the eastern Atlantic Ocean for much of its duration. Late on September 14, the system attained its peak intensity. Thereafter, it began to weakened and fell to tropical depression intensity on September 17. Later that day, the storm dissipated about 475 miles (765 km) south of the central Azores.

=== Hurricane Nine ===
- Category 1 hurricane (SSHWS)
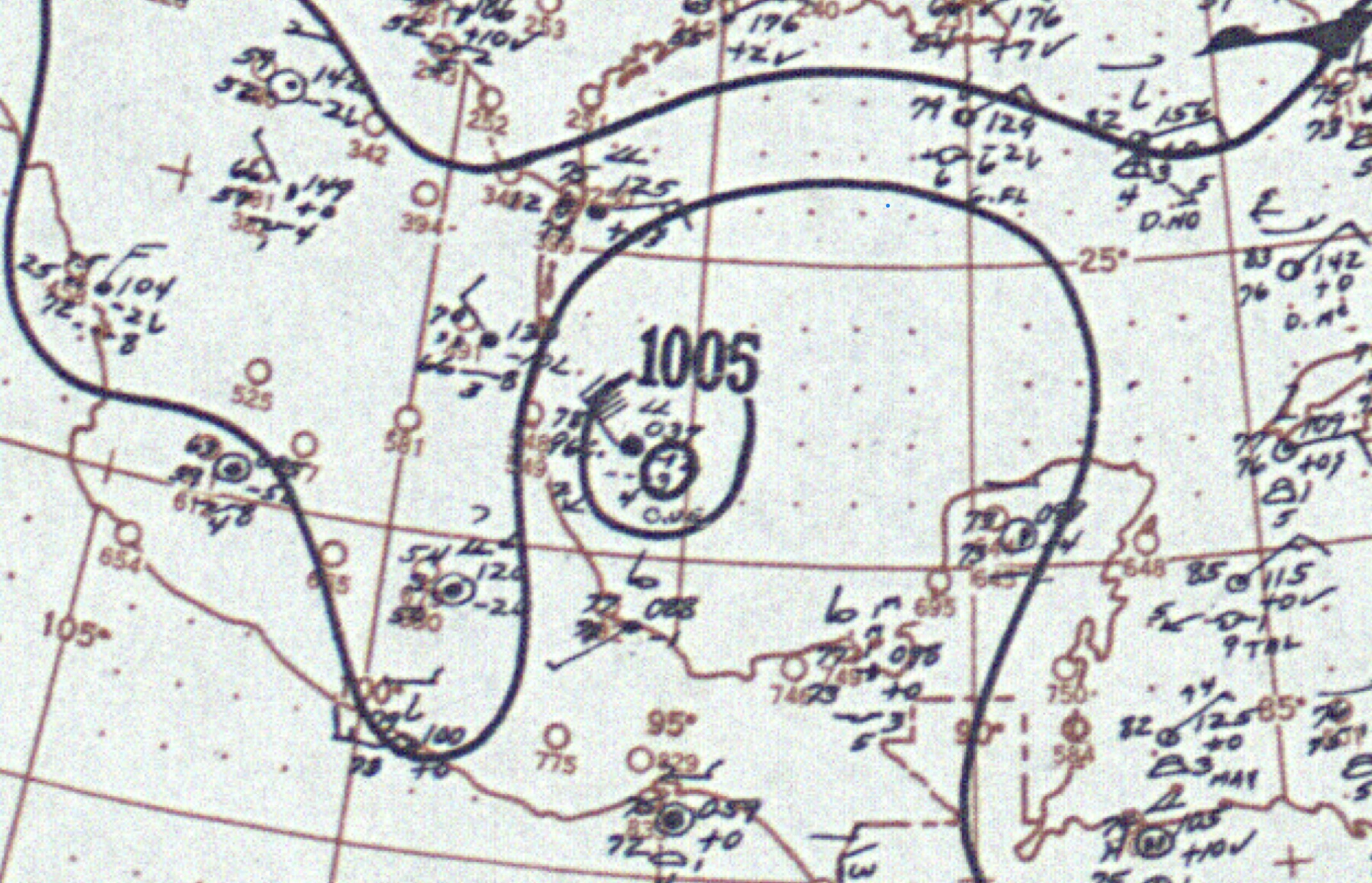
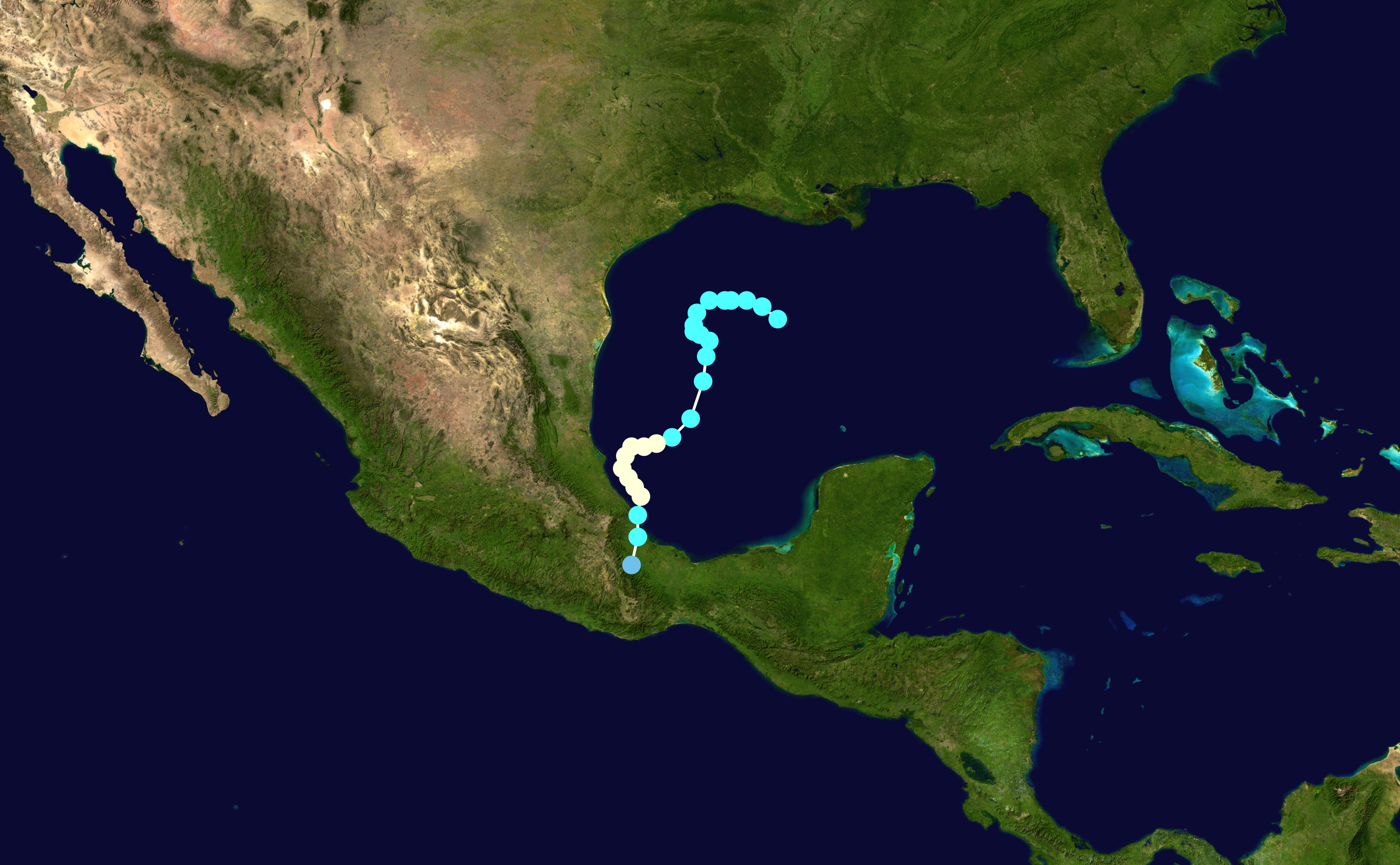
- Duration: September 20 – September 26
- Peak intensity: 90 mph (150 km/h) (1-min); ≤991 mbar (hPa)

A tropical wave entered the Gulf of Mexico on September 18. It moved northwestward and developed into a tropical storm on September 20, while offshore Louisiana. The storm continued northwestward, then turned to the southwest, and erratically looped to the south on September 22. Steadily strengthening as it tracked south-southwestward, the storm intensified into a hurricane on September 24. After turning to the southwest, it reached its peak intensity on September 25. The hurricane weakened as it turned to the south-southeast then south and fell to tropical storm intensity shortly before making landfall between Veracruz and Nautla. The system dissipated by September 26. Operationally, the storm was treated as two separate storms, due to reconnaissance aircraft being unable to report a center of circulation on September 23. The storm produced 2 to 3 ft (0.61 to 0.91 m) higher than normal tides along the coast of Texas and Louisiana, while its outer rainbands produced locally heavy rainfall.

=== Hurricane Ten ===
- Category 1 hurricane (SSHWS)
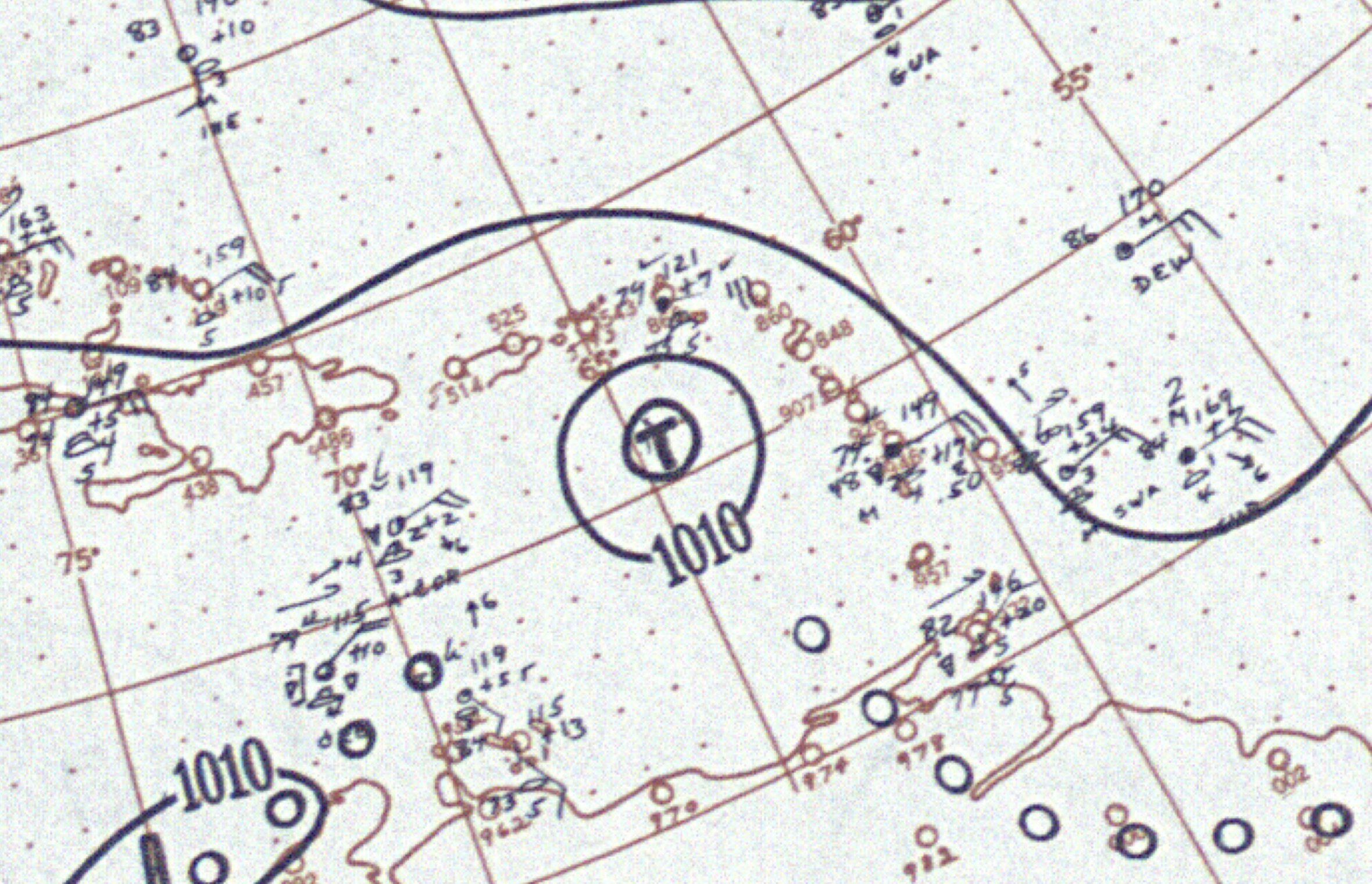
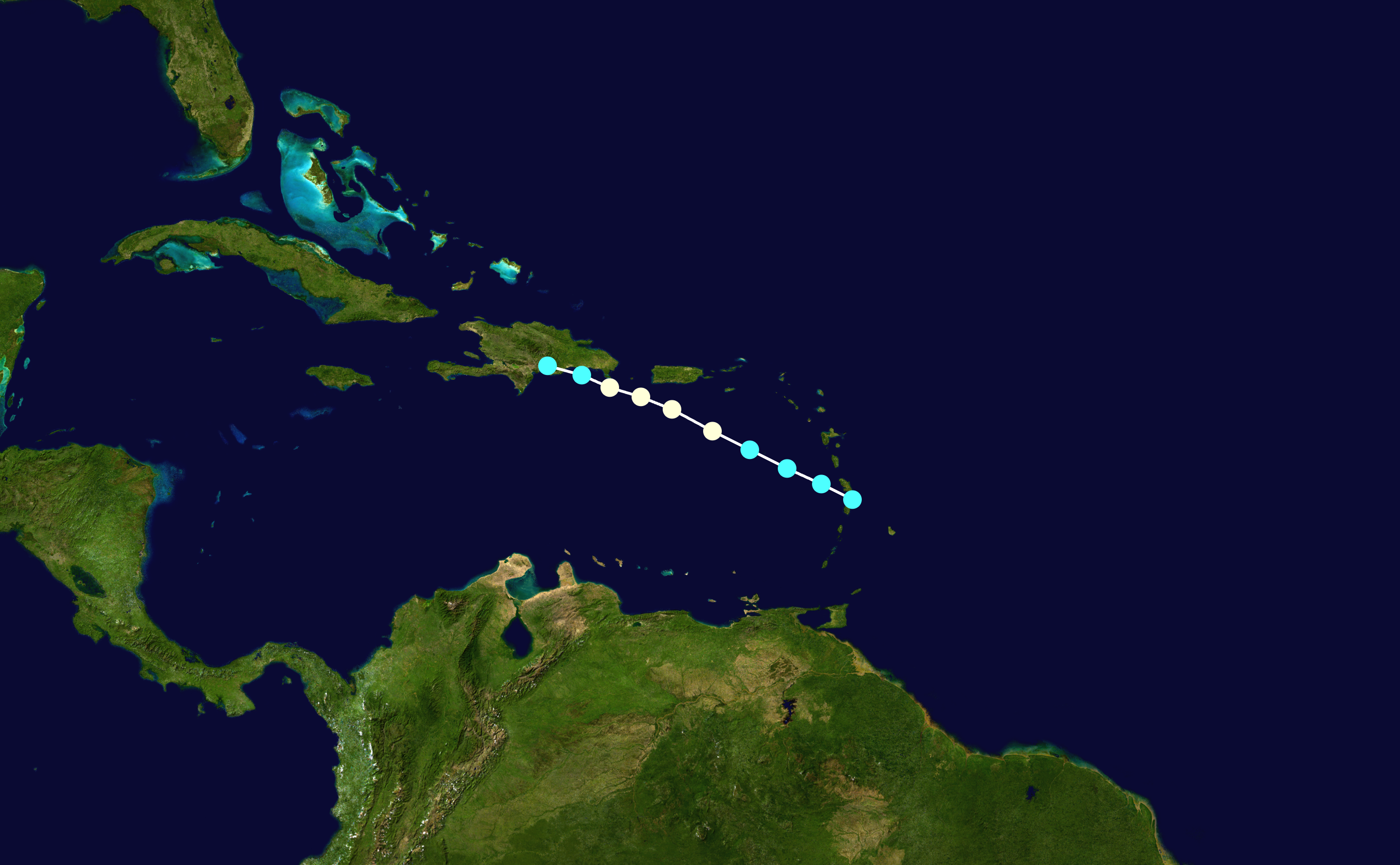
- Duration: September 20 – September 22
- Peak intensity: 80 mph (130 km/h) (1-min); ≤1003 mbar (hPa)

Hurricane San Mateo of 1949
A strong tropical wave approached the Lesser Antilles on September 20. Reconnaissance aircraft reports indicated the system initially lacked a circulation. However, based on a ship report of westerly winds, it is estimated the system developed into a tropical storm late on September 20, while located about 100 miles (160 km) south-southeast of Saint Croix. A small storm, it quickly strengthened as it traversed west-northwestward, and became a hurricane by 12:00 UTC on September 21. After reaching peak winds of 80 mph (130 km/h) the hurricane weakened, and it made landfall on September 22 on the southeastern Dominican Republic as a tropical storm. The storm rapidly dissipated after moving inland.

The cyclone and its precursor produced heavy rains in the Lesser Antilles, including a peak total on Guadeloupe of 16.6 in (422 mm) at Saint-Claude. Consequently, floodwaters swept away bridges and washed out roads. Nine people either died or were left missing. On Martinique, flooding damaged or inundated numerous roads in the capital city of Fort-de-France. Strong winds resulted in heavy damage in Saint Croix. In Puerto Rico, where it was known as the San Mateo Hurricane, wind gusts from the hurricane peaked at 64 mph (103 km/h) in Ramey. Gusty winds disrupted electrical and telephone services between Ponce and Mayagüez. In the latter, residents were evacuated inland to Red Cross shelters. The hurricane dropped heavy rainfall of up to 13.56 in (344 mm) in San Lorenzo, which caused flooding in several rivers in the northern portion of the island. Damage in Puerto Rico totaled to over $1 million, mainly to coffee crops and buildings. In the Dominican Republic, the hurricane killed 15 people, while damage amounted to $12,000.

=== Hurricane Eleven ===
- Category 2 hurricane (SSHWS)
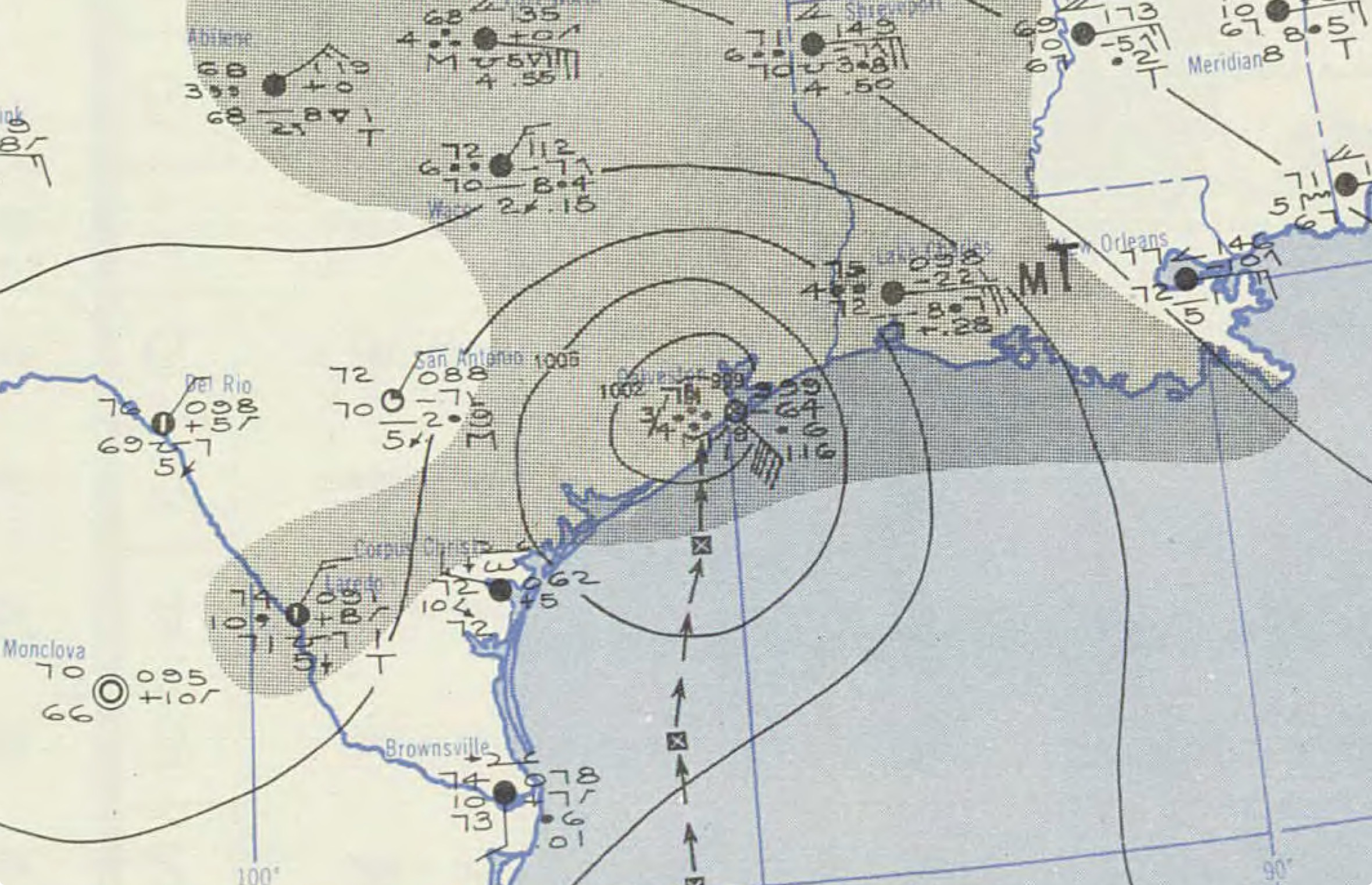
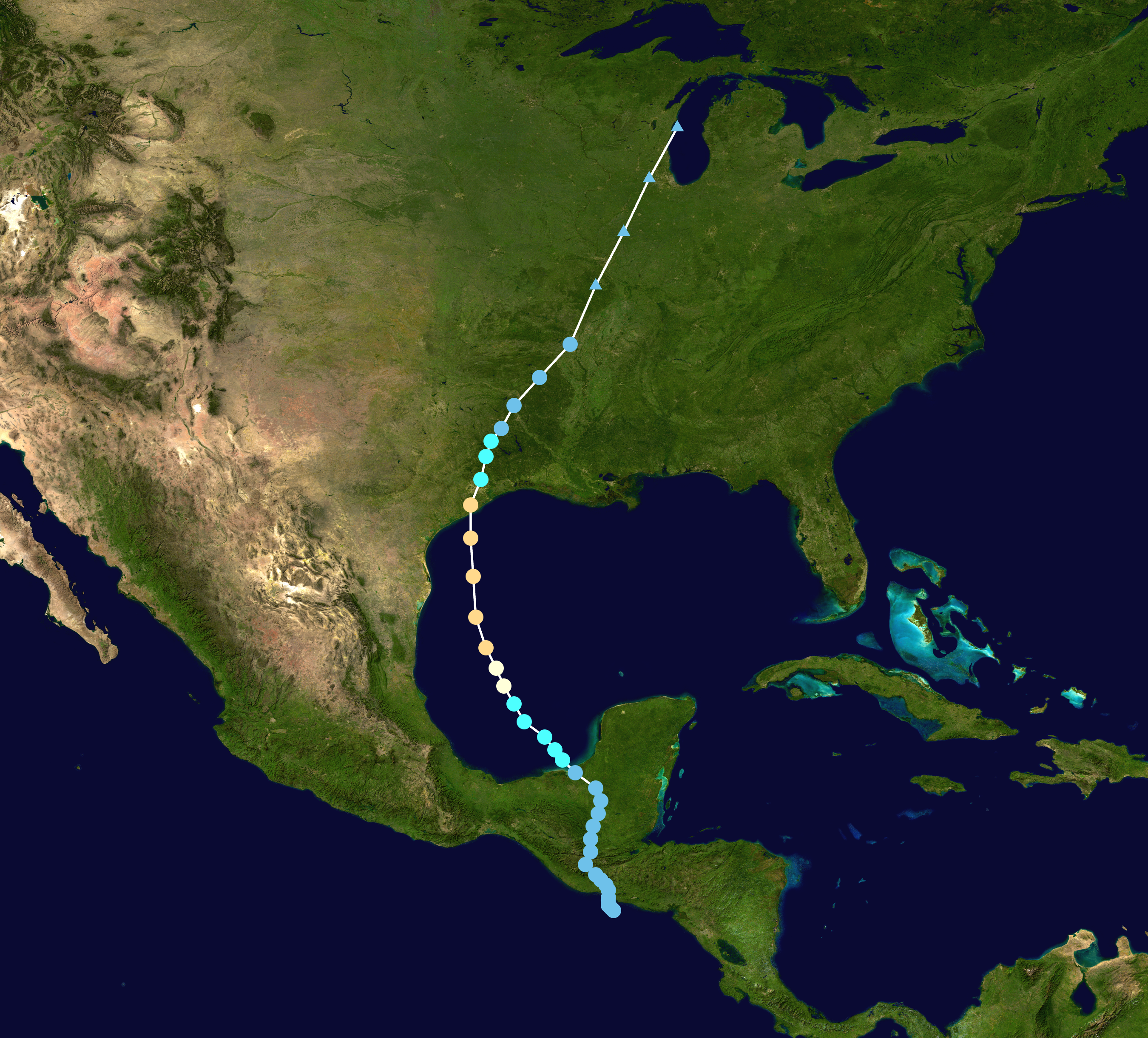
- Duration: September 27 – October 6
- Peak intensity: 110 mph (175 km/h) (1-min); 965 mbar (hPa)

The Texas Hurricane of 1949

A tropical depression formed in the eastern Pacific Ocean just offshore Guatemala on September 27. The depression drifted northwestward and made landfall in Guatemala on September 28. It crossed southeastern Mexico and entered the Gulf of Mexico near Ciudad del Carmen on October 1. Shortly after entering the Gulf of Mexico, the system strengthened into a tropical storm and became a hurricane on October 2. It turned more to the north and intensified to a strong Category 2 hurricane on October 3. Subsequently, the storm made landfall near Freeport, Texas, on October 4 at the same intensity. The hurricane rapidly weakened to a tropical storm as it turned northeastward over land. On October 6, it weakened to a tropical depression over Missouri and later became extratropical. The storm accelerated northeastward and dissipated near Chicago.

The hurricane produced high tides along the Texas coast, peaking at 11 feet (3.4 m) in Velasco. Galveston was temporarily cut off from the mainland when water surpassed the city's seawall. Several streets were flooded in Galveston and the city pier was damaged. Another pier in Port Aransas was nearly destroyed. Freeport sustained the most damage, totaling about $150,000. The hurricane dropped heavy rainfall in Texas, peaking at 14.5 inches (370 mm) in Goodrich. A tornado was also spawned in Riceville, which injured two children. Damage totaled approximately $6.7 million, primarily to crops. The hurricane also caused two deaths, one from electrocution in Port Neches and another due to drowning in Matagorda Bay. Outside of Texas, impact was mainly limited to minor damage to cars in four other states.

=== Tropical Storm Twelve ===
- Tropical storm (SSHWS)
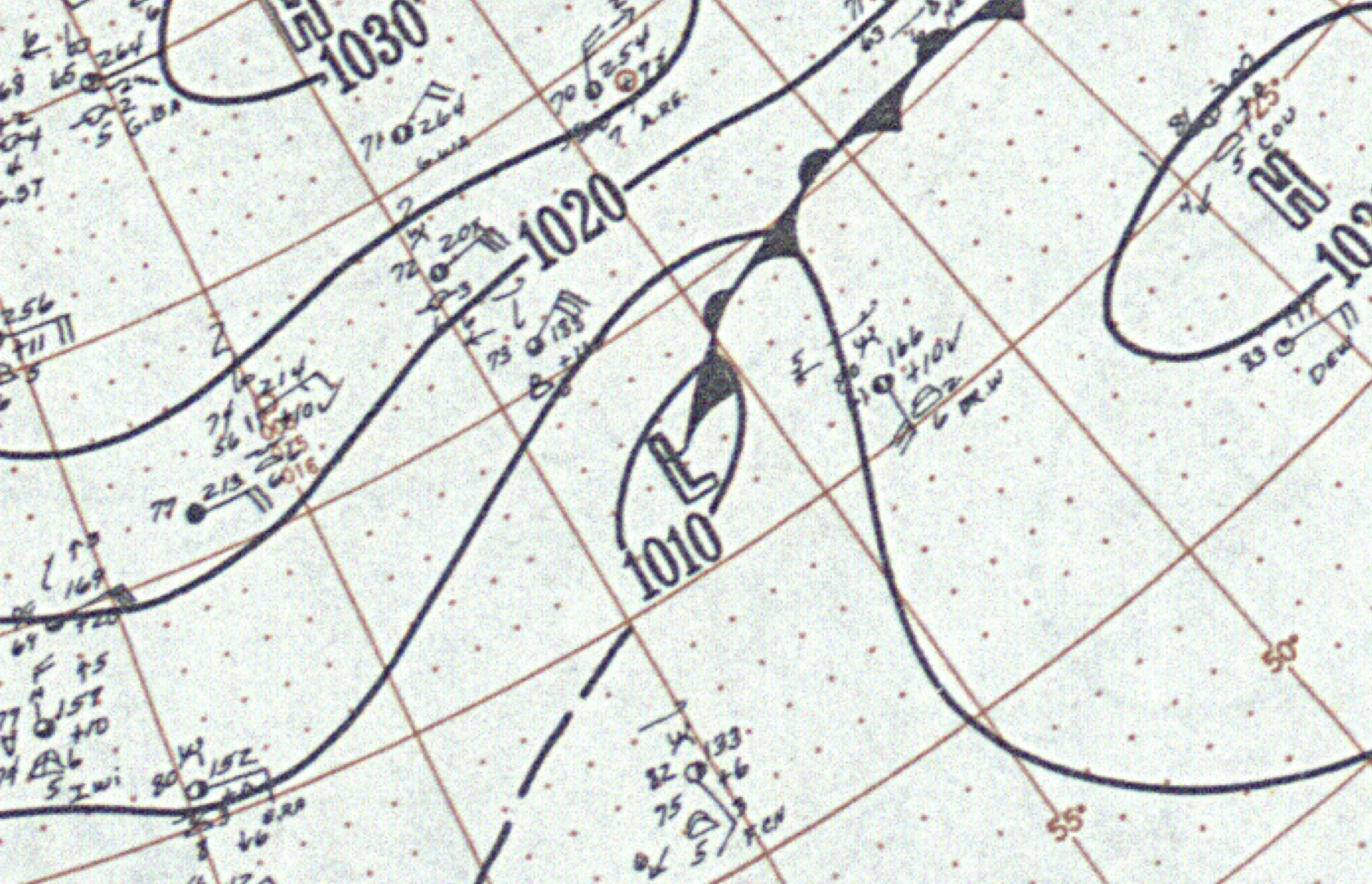
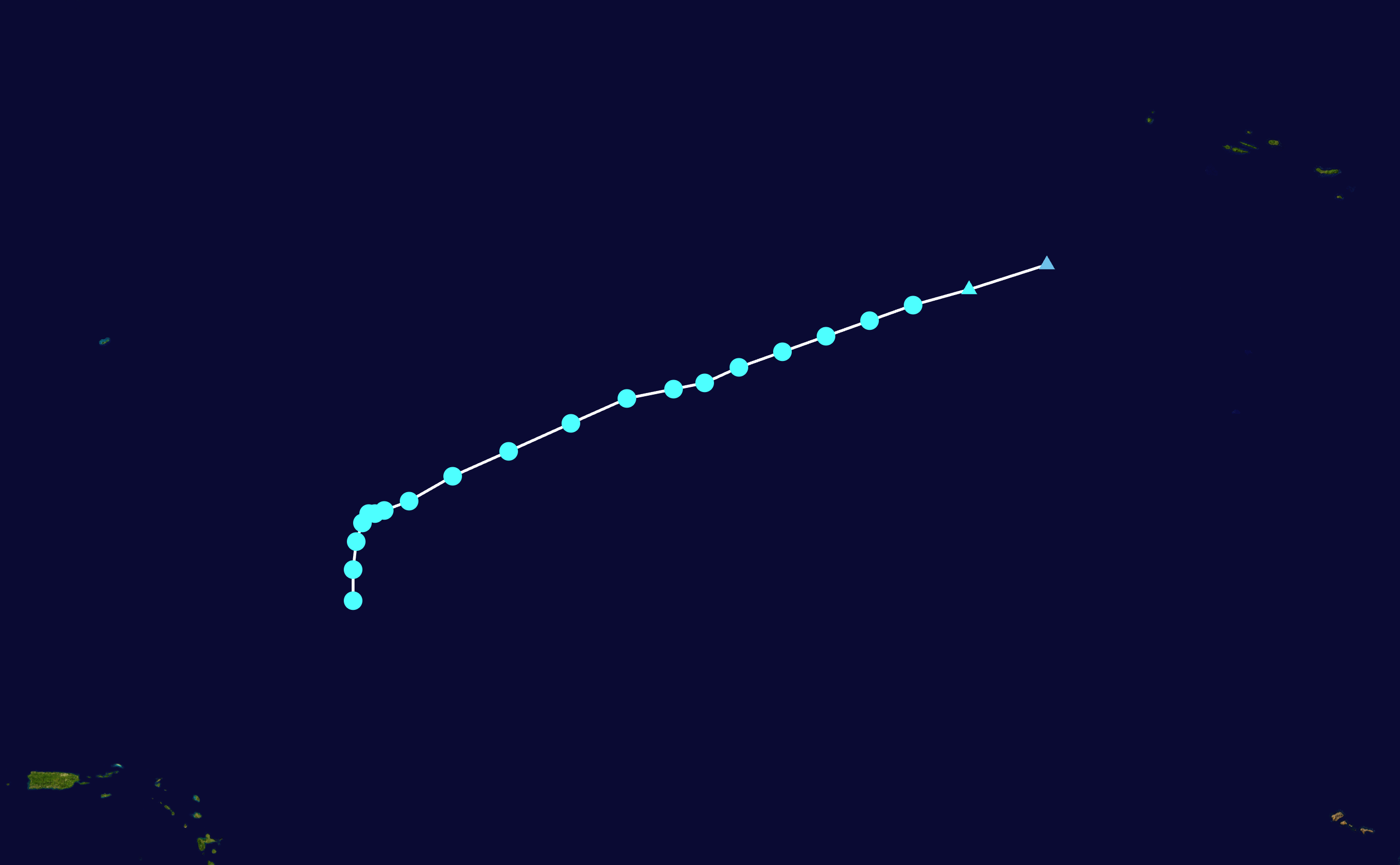
- Duration: October 2 – October 7
- Peak intensity: 60 mph (95 km/h) (1-min); ≤1007 mbar (hPa)

Another tropical storm developed northeast of Puerto Rico on October 2. The system initially moved northward, before curving to the east-northeast on the following day. It slowly strengthened and later peaked with maximum sustained winds of 60 mph (95 km/h) and a minimum barometric pressure of 1,007 mbar (29.7 inHg). By early on October 6, the storm began to weaken and became extratropical the next day. Its remnants continued east-northeastward for about 12 hours, before dissipating on October 7.

=== Hurricane Thirteen ===
- Category 1 hurricane (SSHWS)
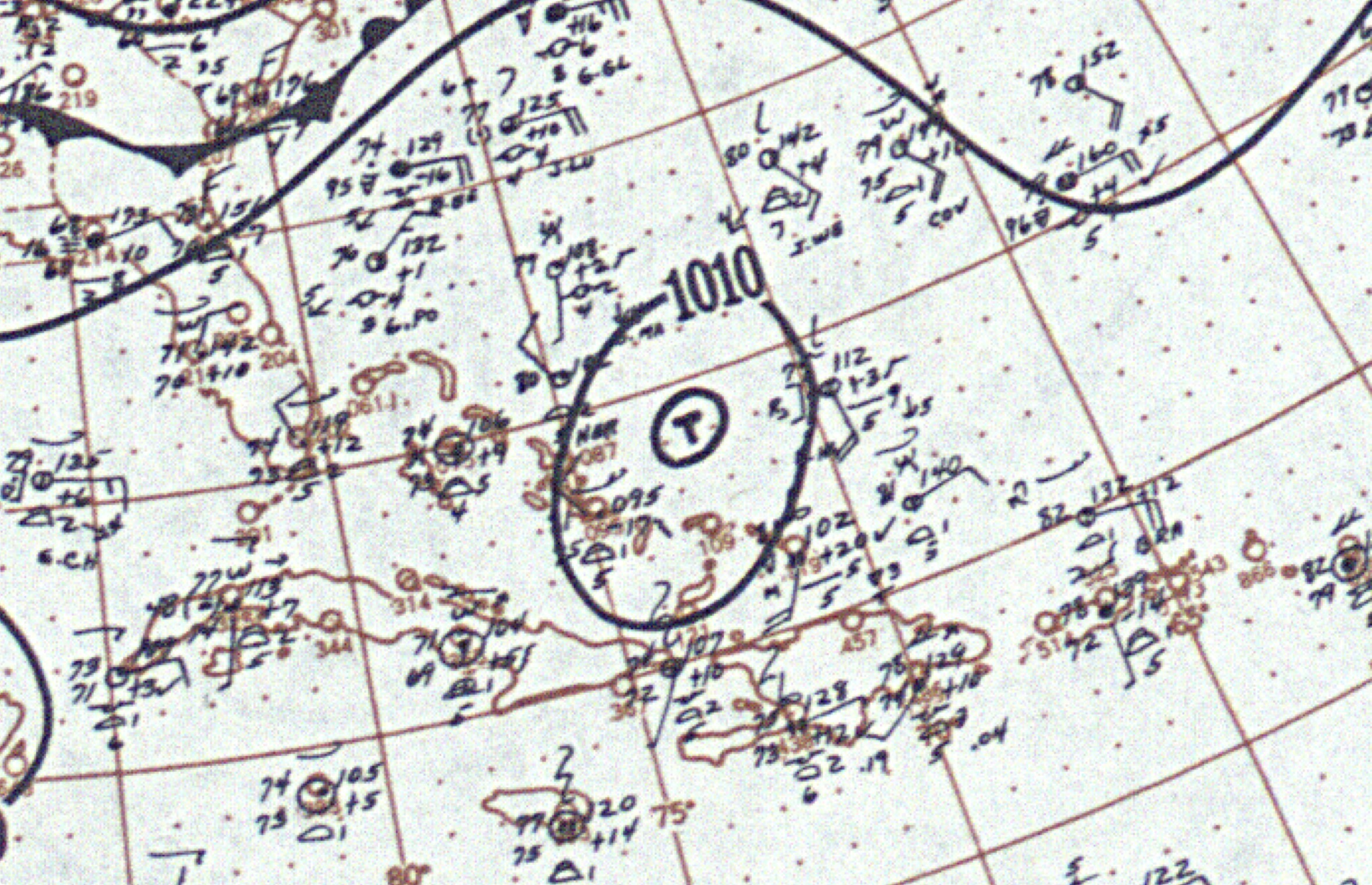
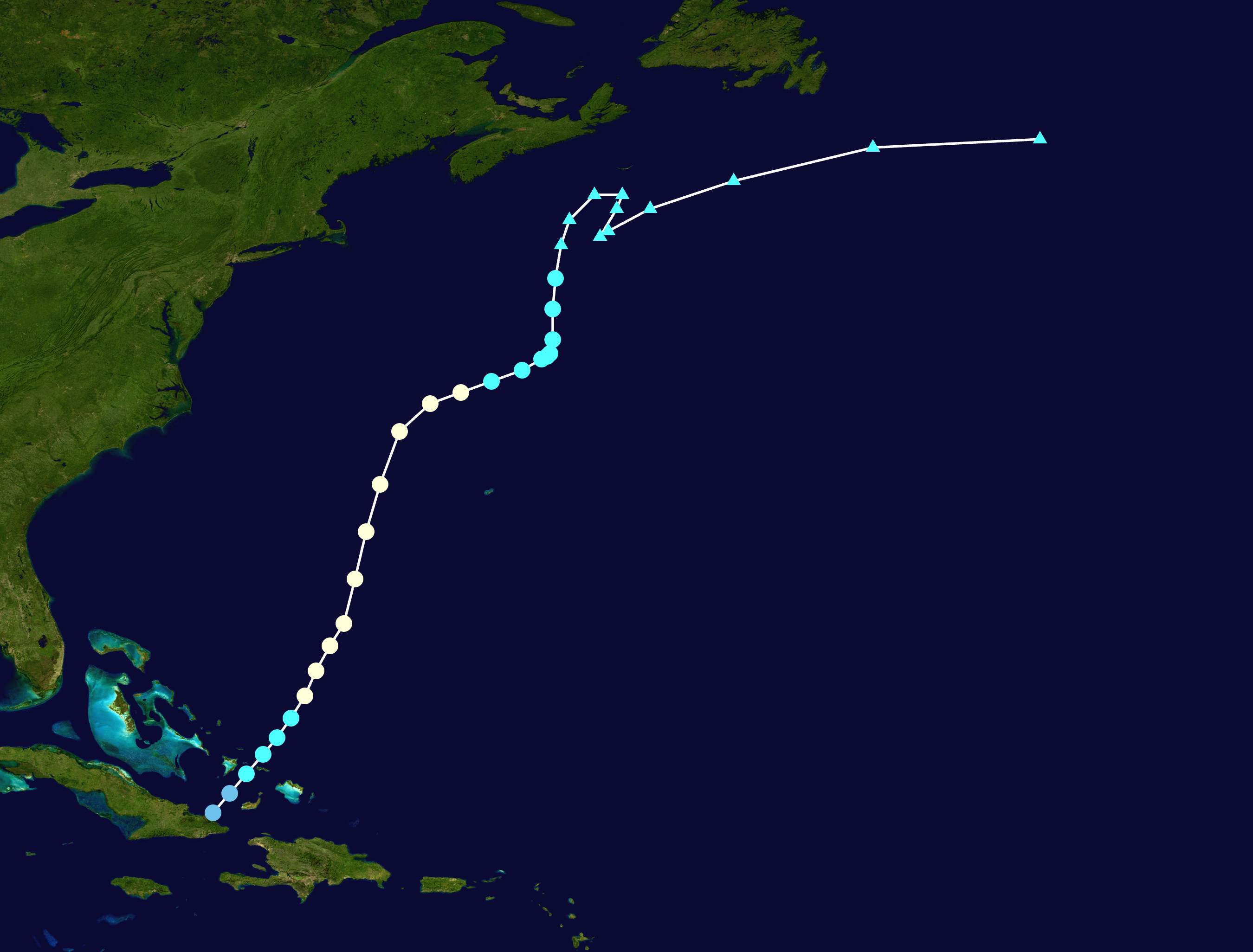
- Duration: October 13 – October 21 (Extratropical on October 19)
- Peak intensity: 90 mph (150 km/h) (1-min); ≤981 mbar (hPa)

Beginning on October 11, an area of disturbed weather moved through the western Caribbean Sea. Early on October 13, a tropical depression made landfall in Guantánamo Province, Cuba. Continuing northeastward, the storm emerged into the Atlantic over the Bahamas. While located over the southeastern Bahamas, the system intensified into a tropical storm. Further intensification occurred and it became a hurricane on October 14, after exiting the Bahamas. Late on the following day, the hurricane reached its peak intensity. Thereafter, the storm began to deteriorate, weakening to a tropical storm on October 17. It became transitioned into an extratropical cyclone on October 19.

=== Tropical Storm Fourteen ===
- Tropical storm (SSHWS)
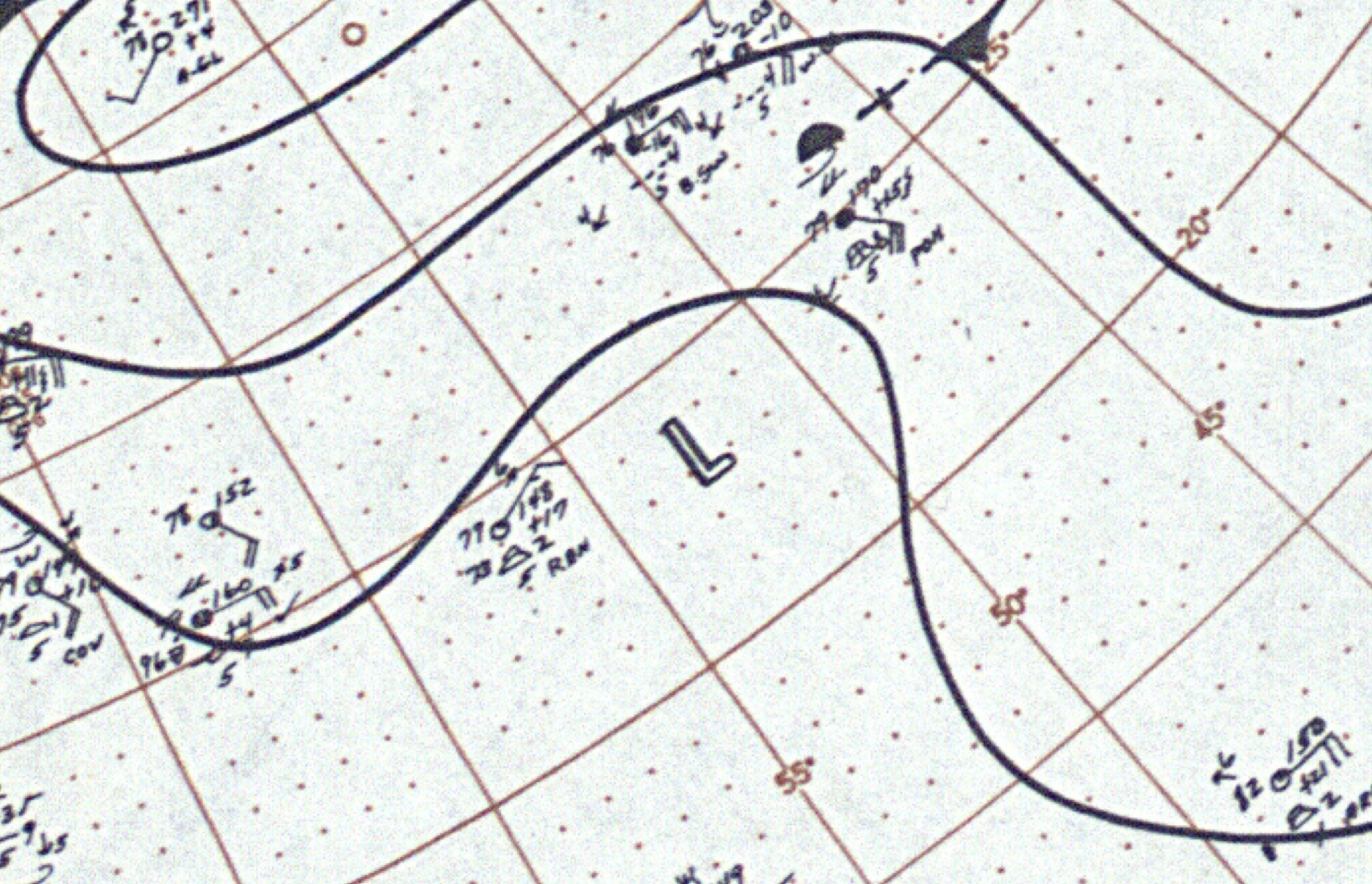
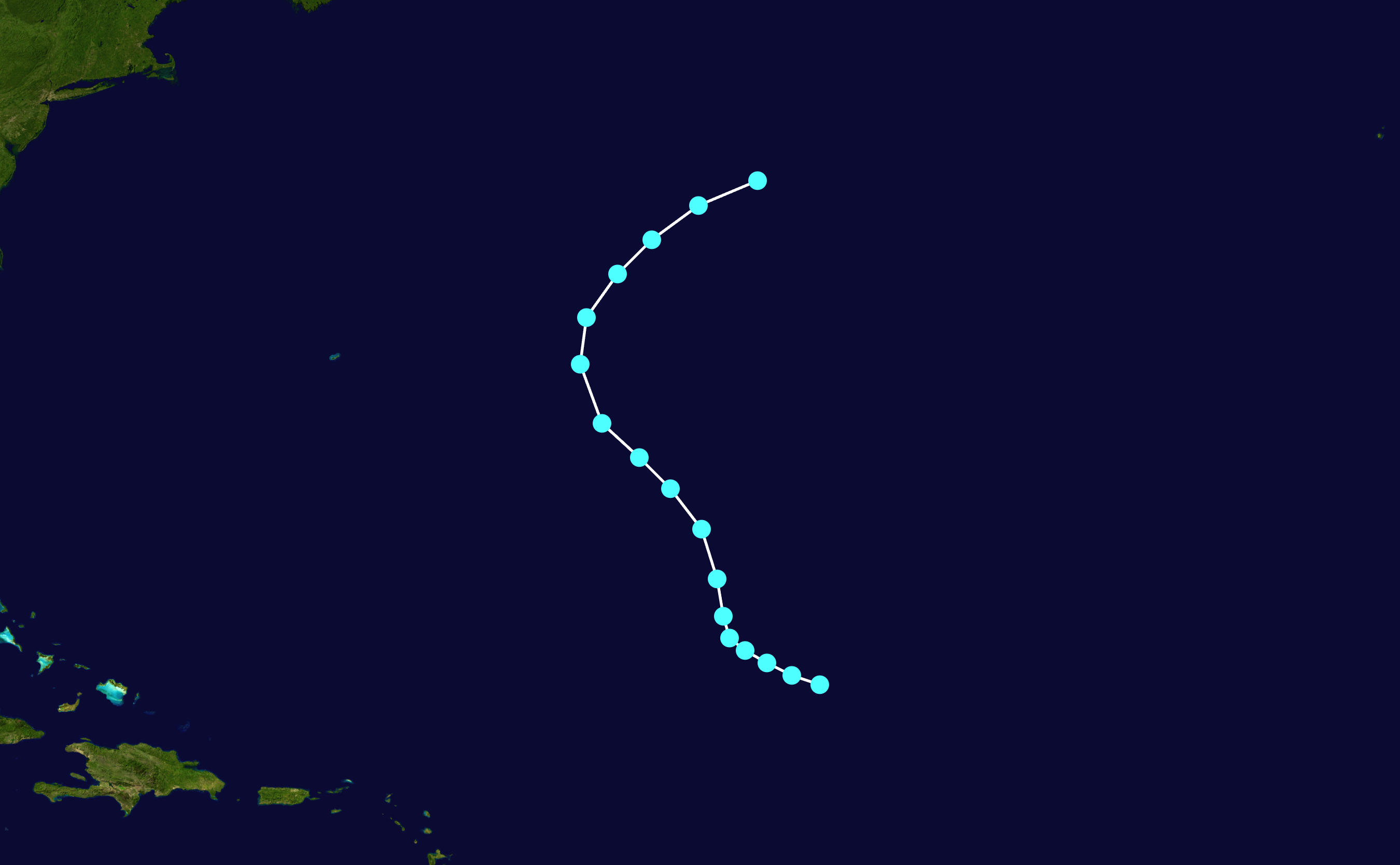
- Duration: October 13 – October 17
- Peak intensity: 60 mph (95 km/h) (1-min); ≤1004 mbar (hPa)

A tropical storm was first observed about 865 miles (1,400 km) east-northeast of Barbuda. The storm initially moved west-northwestward, until re-curving northwestward on October 14. It strengthened slowly and peaked with maximum sustained winds of 60 mph (95 km/h). Thereafter, the storm began to weakened and fell to tropical depression intensity on October 17. Several hours later, it dissipated while located about 620 miles (1,000 km) south of Cape Race, Newfoundland.

=== Tropical Storm Fifteen ===
- Tropical storm (SSHWS)
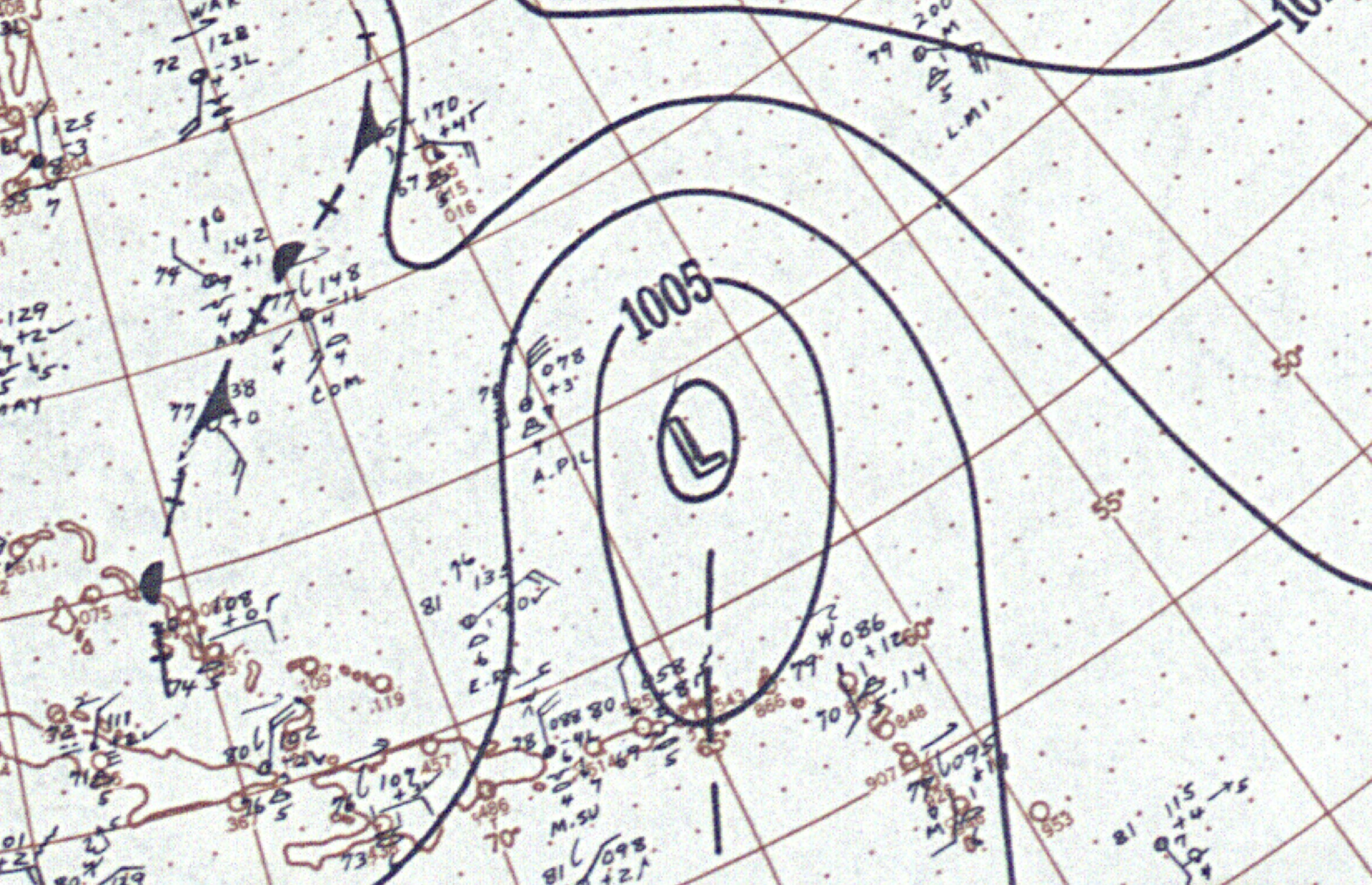
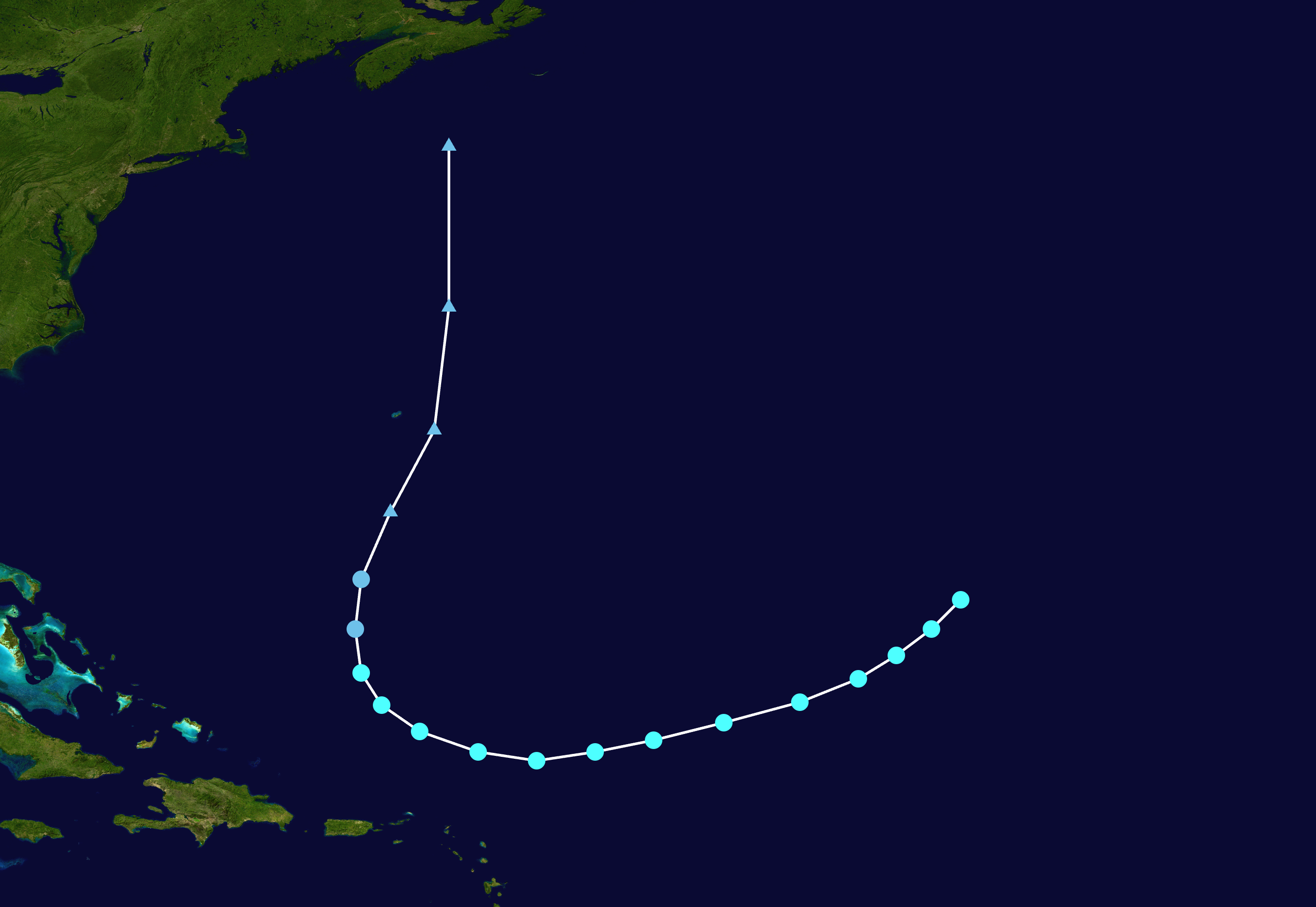
- Duration: November 1 – November 5
- Peak intensity: 50 mph (85 km/h) (1-min); ≤1001 mbar (hPa)

A tropical storm developed over the central Atlantic Ocean on November 1. The system moved southwestward and then west-southwestward, strengthening slowly during this time. On November 2, it peaked with maximum sustained winds of 50 mph (85 km/h) and a minimum barometric pressure of 1,001 mbar (29.6 inHg). The storm began to weaken while appearing to threaten the Lesser Antilles, but later curved northwestward. On November 4, the system turned northward and weakened to a tropical depression. Early the next day, it became extratropical. The remnants continued northward before dissipating on November 6.

=== Tropical Storm Sixteen ===
- Tropical storm (SSHWS)
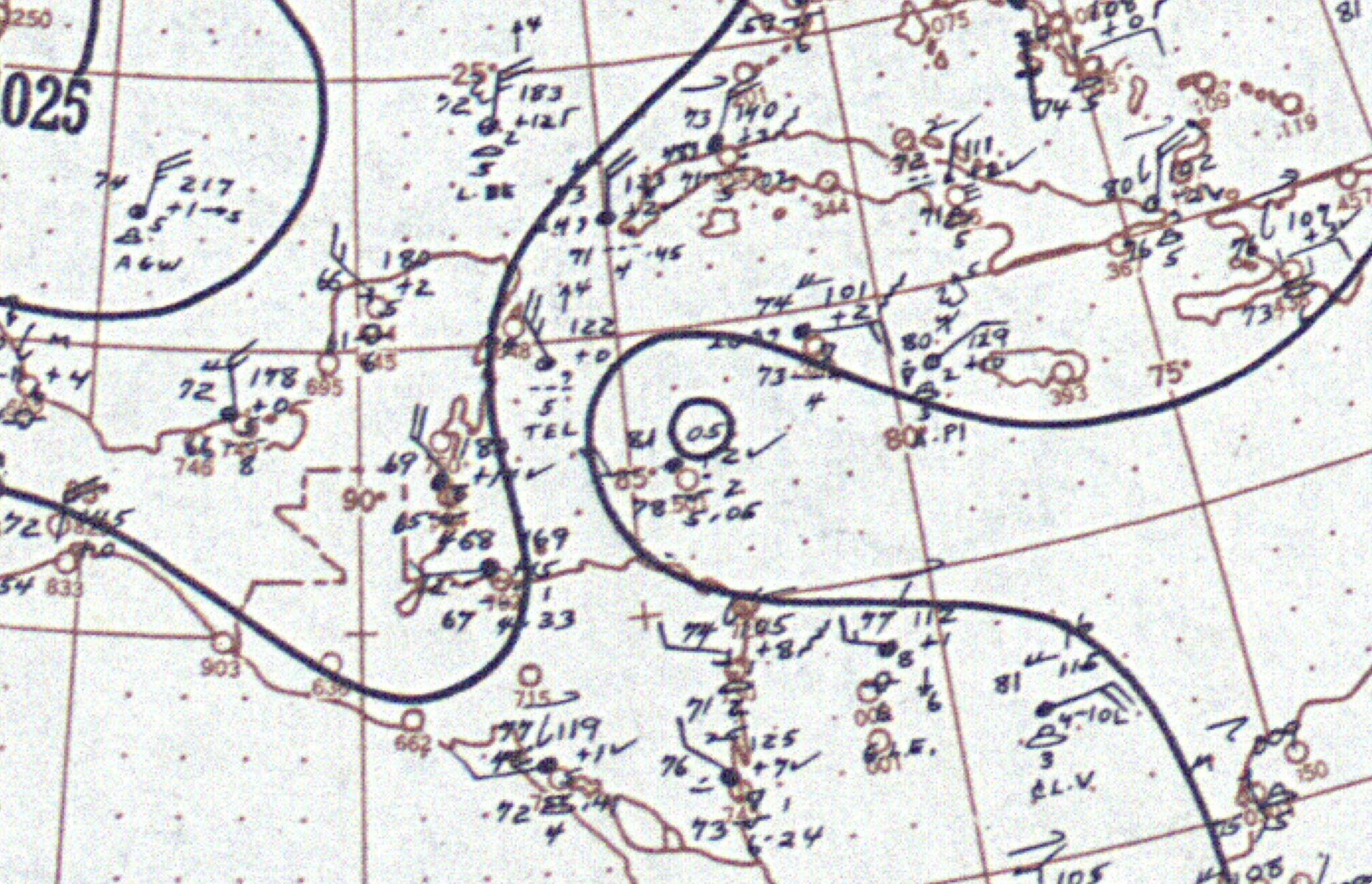
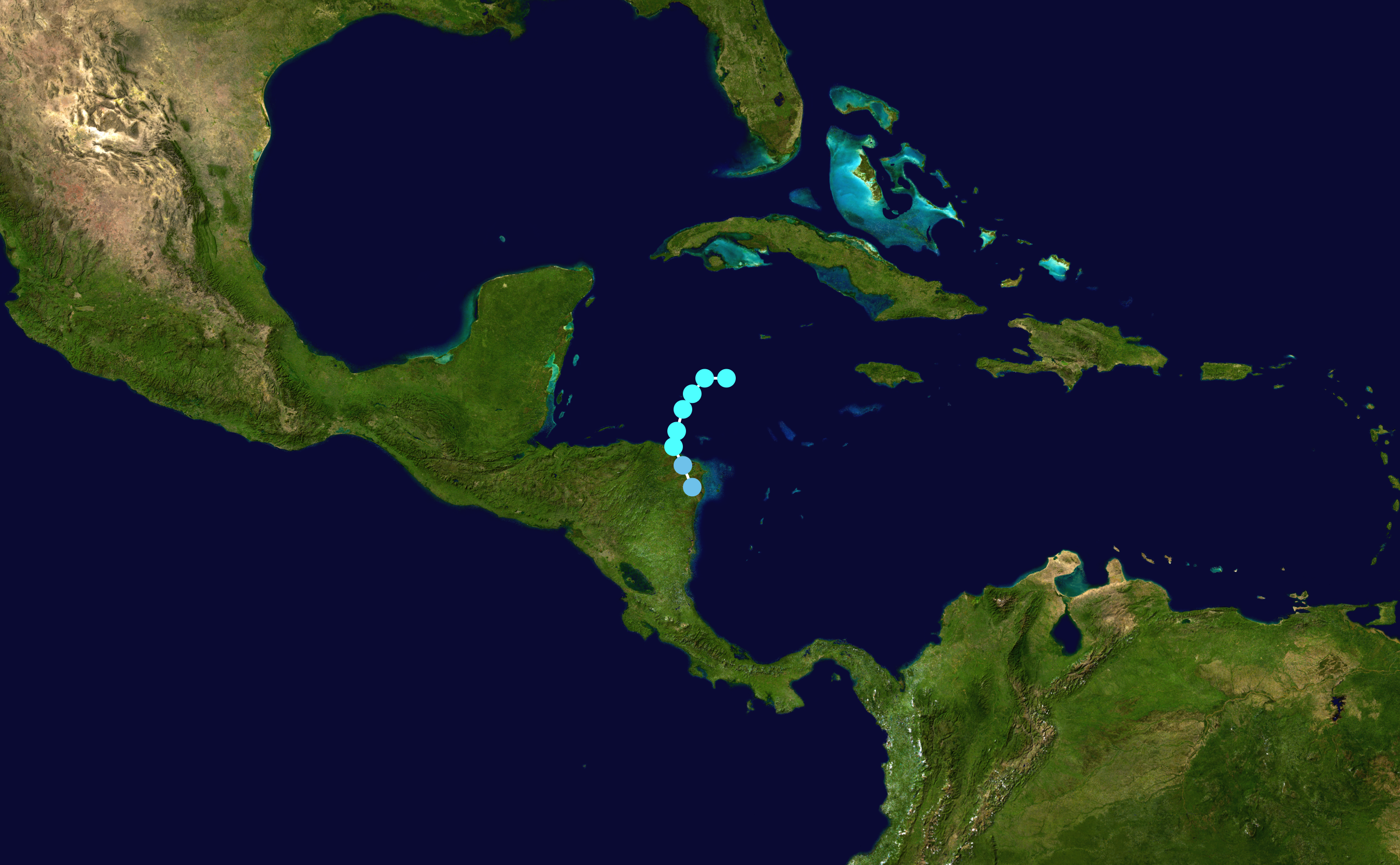
- Duration: November 3 – November 5
- Peak intensity: 65 mph (100 km/h) (1-min); 993 mbar (hPa)

The final storm developed from a persistent low pressure area in the northwestern Caribbean Sea near Swan Island on November 3. A reconnaissance aircraft reported a well-defined eye feature as the storm reached its peak intensity. The storm drifted south-southwestward and began weakening on November 4. Later that day, it made landfall over northeastern Honduras as a tropical depression. Shortly after moving inland, the system dissipated.

== See also ==
- 1949 Pacific hurricane season
- 1949 Pacific typhoon season
- 1900–1950 South-West Indian Ocean cyclone seasons
- 1940s Australian region cyclone seasons
- 1940s South Pacific cyclone seasons
