= Goodrich High School (Texas) =

Location
- 234 Katie Simpson Street; Goodrich, Texas 77335-0789; United States; 30.606490°N 94.945725°W

Information
- School type: Public high school
- School district: Goodrich Independent School District
- Principal: Lara Devillier
- Grades: 9-12
- Enrollment: 76 (2023-2024)
- Colors: Orange & Black
- Athletics conference: UIL Class A
- Mascot: Hornet
- Website: Goodrich High School

Goodrich High School is a 1A public high school located in Goodrich, Texas. It is a part of the Goodrich Independent School District that serves students in south central Polk County, Texas. In 2011, the school was rated "Academically Unacceptable" by the Texas Education Agency.

== Athletics ==
The Goodrich Hornets compete in these sports -

- Basketball
- Cross Country
- Tennis
- Track and Field
- Volleyball

=== State titles ===
- Boys Basketball -
  - 2001(1A/D2)

==== State finalists ====
- Boys Basketball -
  - 1998(1A), 2002(1A/D2), 2008(1A/D1)
