= Goodrich Independent School District =

School district in Texas, United States

Address
- 234 Katie Simpson Goodrich, Texas, 77335; United States

District information
- Type: Public
- Grades: PK–12
- Schools: 3
- NCES District ID: 4821090

Students and staff
- Students: 272 (2023–2024)
- Teachers: 22.17 (on an FTE basis) (2023–2024)
- Staff: 28.15 (on an FTE basis) (2023–2024)
- Student–teacher ratio: 12.27 (2023–2024)

Other information
- Website: www.goodrichisd.net

Goodrich Independent School District is a public school district based in Goodrich, Texas (USA) that serves students in south central Polk County.

== Schools ==
The district has three schools - All 3 schools and the administration building are located on the same "campus". The middle school and elementary school are in the same building.

- Goodrich High School (Grades 9-12),
- Goodrich Middle (Grades 6-8)
- Goodrich Elementary (Grades PK-5)

In 2009, the school district was rated "academically acceptable" by the Texas Education Agency.
