= Goodrich, Texas =

- City
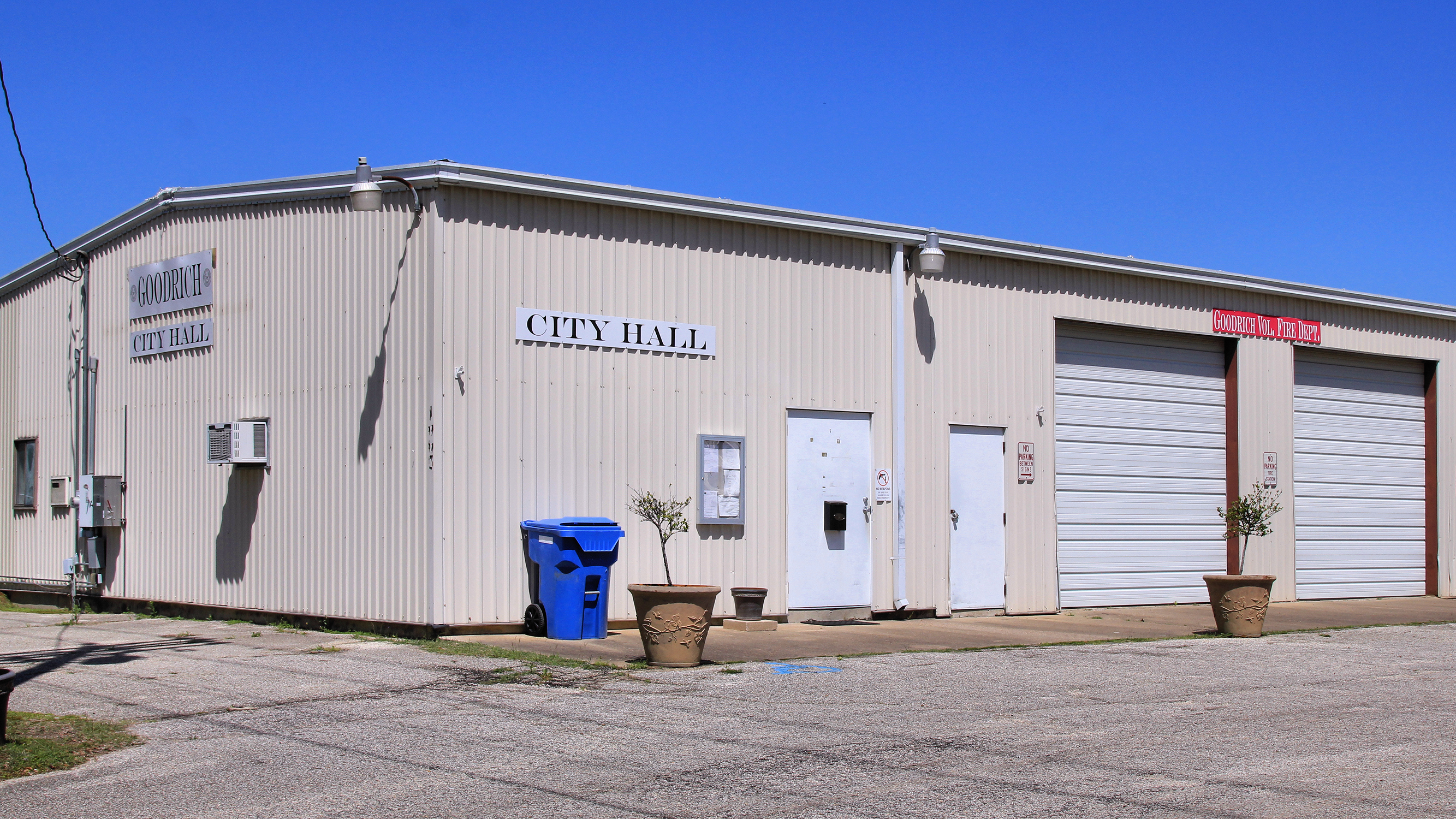
- City hall and fire station

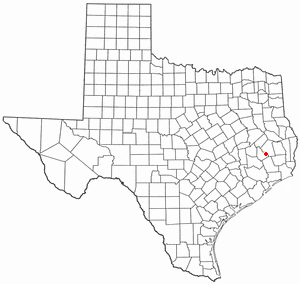
- Location of Goodrich, Texas

- Coordinates: 30°36′33″N 94°56′48″W
- Country: United States
- State: Texas
- County: Polk

Area
  - Total: 0.71 sq mi (1.83 km^{2})
  - Land: 0.71 sq mi (1.83 km^{2})
  - Water: 0 sq mi (0.00 km^{2})
- Elevation: 112 ft (34 m)

Population (2020)
  - Total: 248
  - Density: 351/sq mi (136/km^{2})
- Time zone: UTC-6 (Central (CST))
  - Summer (DST): UTC-5 (CDT)
- ZIP code: 77335
- Area code: 936
- FIPS code: 48-30224
- GNIS feature ID: 2410621
- Website: goodrichtx.org

Goodrich is a city in Polk County, Texas, United States. The population was 248 at the 2020 census.

== Geography ==
According to the United States Census Bureau, the city has a total area of 0.7 square miles (1.8 km^{2}), all land.

== Demographics ==
Historical population
Census	Pop.	Note	%±
1980	350		—
1990	239		−31.7%
2000	243		1.7%
2010	271		11.5%
2020	248		−8.5%
U.S. Decennial Census; 2020 Census

=== 2020 census ===
As of the 2020 census, Goodrich had a population of 248. The median age was 37.0 years. 29.0% of residents were under the age of 18 and 13.7% of residents were 65 years of age or older. For every 100 females there were 79.7 males, and for every 100 females age 18 and over there were 67.6 males age 18 and over.

0.0% of residents lived in urban areas, while 100.0% lived in rural areas.

There were 94 households in Goodrich, of which 37.2% had children under the age of 18 living in them. Of all households, 43.6% were married-couple households, 9.6% were households with a male householder and no spouse or partner present, and 36.2% were households with a female householder and no spouse or partner present. About 18.1% of all households were made up of individuals and 8.5% had someone living alone who was 65 years of age or older.

There were 116 housing units, of which 19.0% were vacant. The homeowner vacancy rate was 0.0% and the rental vacancy rate was 6.7%.

Racial composition as of the 2020 census
Race	Number	Percent
White	129	52.0%
Black or African American	44	17.7%
American Indian and Alaska Native	0	0.0%
Asian	0	0.0%
Native Hawaiian and Other Pacific Islander	0	0.0%
Some other race	29	11.7%
Two or more races	46	18.5%
Hispanic or Latino (of any race)	71	28.6%

=== 2000 census ===
As of the 2000 census, there were 243 people, 90 households, and 66 families residing in the city. The population density was 343.9 inhabitants per square mile (132.8/km^{2}). There were 119 housing units at an average density of 168.4 per square mile (65.0/km^{2}). The racial makeup of the city was 71.19% White, 14.40% African American, 2.88% Asian, 9.05% from other races, and 2.47% from two or more races. Hispanic or Latino of any race were 14.81% of the population.

There were 90 households, out of which 35.6% had children under the age of 18 living with them, 56.7% were married couples living together, 11.1% had a female householder with no husband present, and 25.6% were non-families. 23.3% of all households were made up of individuals, and 6.7% had someone living alone who was 65 years of age or older. The average household size was 2.70 and the average family size was 3.19.

In the city, the population was spread out, with 28.0% under the age of 18, 9.1% from 18 to 24, 27.6% from 25 to 44, 19.3% from 45 to 64, and 16.0% who were 65 years of age or older. The median age was 36 years. For every 100 females, there were 94.4 males. For every 100 females age 18 and over, there were 92.3 males.

The median income for a household in the city was $23,125, and the median income for a family was $26,786. Males had a median income of $23,438 versus $10,625 for females. The per capita income for the city was $9,354. About 25.7% of families and 34.6% of the population were below the poverty line, including 33.3% of those under the age of eighteen and 29.6% of those 65 or over.

== Education ==
The City of Goodrich is served by the Goodrich Independent School District and is home to the Goodrich High School Hornets.
