= List of shipwrecks in August 1856 =

The list of shipwrecks in August 1856 includes ships sunk, foundered, grounded, or otherwise lost during August 1856.

== 1 August ==
List of shipwrecks: 1 August 1856
Ship	State	Description
Challenger	United Kingdom	The ship was driven ashore at the mouth of the Woosung River. She was on a voyage from Shanghai, China to London. She was refloated the next day and put back to Shanghai for repairs.
John Harley	United Kingdom	The ship ran aground on the Fortune Shoal, off Smyrna, Ottoman Empire. She was on a voyage from Newport, Monmouthshire to Smyrna. She was refloated and taken in to port.
Lavinia	United Kingdom	The ship was driven ashore at Narva, Russia.

== 2 August ==
List of shipwrecks: 2 August 1856
Ship	State	Description
Artisan	United Kingdom	The steamship ran aground in the Clyde at Dalmarnock, Renfrewshire. She was refloated.

== 3 August ==
List of shipwrecks: 3 August 1856
Ship	State	Description
Henriette	United Kingdom	The ship was run down and sunk in the Mediterranean Sea off Cape Bon, Tunisia by a steamship. Her crew were rescued. She was on a voyage from Agrigento, Sicily to Marseille, Bouches-du-Rhône.

== 4 August ==
List of shipwrecks: 4 August 1856
Ship	State	Description
Commerce	United Kingdom	The schooner ran aground on the Medemsand, in the North Sea. She was on a voyage from Newcastle upon Tyne, Northumberland to Hamburg. She was refloated on 7 August and resumed her voyage in a leaky condition.
Isis	United Kingdom	The barque was wrecked on a reef off the Rabbit Islands, Ottoman Empire. She was on a voyage from Liverpool, Lancashire to Constantinople, Ottoman Empire.
Othello	United Kingdom	The barque ran aground off South Shields, County Durham. She was on a voyage from Agrigento, Sicily to South Shields.

== 5 August ==
List of shipwrecks: 5 August 1856
Ship	State	Description
Cepholide	France	The full-rigged ship was wrecked in the Mellicouri River, Africa.
Perseverance	United Kingdom	The ship foundered in the North Sea off Filey, Yorkshire. Her crew were rescued. She was on a voyage from South Shields, County Durham to Caen, Calvados, France.
William McCormick	United Kingdom	The paddle steamer ran aground west of Ennishowen Head, County Donegal. Her passengers were taken off and she was beached in Moville Bay. She was on a voyage from Liverpool, Lancashire to Londonderry. William McCormick was refloated on 16 August and taken in to Liverpool.

== 6 August ==
List of shipwrecks: 6 August 1856
Ship	State	Description
Jane Nearns	United Kingdom	The ship was wrecked on "Byron Island", British North America. Her crew were rescued. She was on a voyage from London to Quebec City, Province of Canada, British North America.
Maid of Orleans	United States	The ship was driven ashore on the coast of Florida. She was on a voyage from New Orleans, Louisiana to Liverpool, Lancashire, United Kingdom. She was refloated and taken in to Key West, Florida.
Meg Lee	United Kingdom	The ship was driven ashore at Cagliari, Sardinia. She was on a voyage from Newcastle upon Tyne, Northumberland to Messina, Sicily. She was refloated with assistance from Tartare French Navy).

== 7 August ==
List of shipwrecks: 7 August 1856
Ship	State	Description
Anne Jane	United Kingdom	The ship was run ashore at Cape Town, Cape Colony.
Kent	United Kingdom	The ship was driven ashore and wrecked near the mouth of the Salt River, Cape Colony. Her crew were rescued. She was on a voyage from Madras, India to London.

== 8 August ==
List of shipwrecks: 8 August 1856
Ship	State	Description
Bianco	Netherlands	An insurrection by coolies on board the ship at Macao, China was put down by the officers and the coolies were confined below. They set the ship afire. She exploded and sank with the loss of about 350 of the 500 people on board. She was on a voyage from Macao to Havana, Cuba.
Diana	United Kingdom	The ship struck a sunken rock in Mount's Bay and was consequently beached at Falmouth, Cornwall. She was on a voyage from Liverpool, Lancashire to Dordrecht, South Holland, Netherlands.
Florence	United Kingdom	The barque was driven ashore on Peter's Island, at the mouth of the Machias River. She was on a voyage from Glasgow, Renfrewshire to Windsor, Nova Scotia, British North America.
George Hawkins	United Kingdom	The steamship struck the Reval Stone and sank off Reval, Russia. She was on a voyage from Kronstadt, Russia to London.
Indus	France	The full-rigged ship was wrecked at Grand Point, Mauritius.

== 9 August ==
List of shipwrecks: 9 August 1856
Ship	State	Description
Anne Jane	United Kingdom	The ship was driven ashore in Table Bay. She had been refloated by 15 August.
Claremont	United Kingdom	The barque was driven ashore and severely damaged at the mouth of the Machias River. She was on a voyage from Boston, Massachusetts, United States to Saint John, New Brunswick, British North America.
Elleralie	United States	1856 Last Island Hurricane. The ship was driven ashore in the Mississippi River upstream of the Southwest Pass. She was on a voyage from New Orleans, Louisiana to Pensacola, Florida.
Exceed	United Kingdom	1856 Last Island Hurricane: The schooner foundered in the Gulf of Mexico.
Kent	United Kingdom	The ship was wrecked in Table Bay. She was on a voyage from Madras, India to London.
Manchester	United Kingdom	1856 Last Island Hurricane: The schooner was driven ashore at South Point, New Orleans, Louisiana, United States.
Manila	United States	1856 Last Island Hurricane: The full-rigged ship foundered off Timbalier Island, Louisiana with the loss of ten of the 30 people on board. She was on a voyage from Bordeaux, Gironde, France to New Orleans, Louisiana.
Nautilus	United States	1856 Last Island Hurricane: The steamship foundered off Last Island, Louisiana with the loss of all hands.
Star	United States	1856 Last Island Hurricane: The steamship was wrecked on Last Island. All on board, more than 250 people, were rescued by Major Aubrey (United States).

== 10 August ==
List of shipwrecks: 10 August 1856
Ship	State	Description
Alexander Coffin	United States	The ship ran aground in the Sea of Okhotsk at Makanrushi in the northern Kuril Islands during a heavy fog. She was righted by cutting away her masts and got off the rocks by lightening her of gear and cargo. She then was jury-rigged for sailing and taken to Ayan, Russia, where she was condemned and sold at auction. The crew and cargo of whale oil and whalebone were saved.
Arabia	United States	Reportedly carrying a cargo of whisky, the 222-tons burden sidewheel paddle steamer sank in the Missouri River below Parkville, Missouri.
George	United Kingdom	The barque struck the Tuskar Rock and foundered. Her crew survived. She was on a voyage from Liverpool, Lancashire to Quebec City, Province of Canada, British North America.
Impetuous	United Kingdom	The ship was driven ashore and severely damaged at Flamborough Head, Yorkshire. She was refloated and taken in to Bridlington, Yorkshire.
James Stewart	United Kingdom	The ship was driven ashore and wrecked on Ratlin Island, County Donegal. Her crew were rescued. She was on a voyage from Greenock, Renfrewshire to Newfoundland, British North America.
Lallah Rookh	United Kingdom	The ship sprang a leak and was beached at Swatow, China.
Lyonnais	France	The steamship ran aground in the Danube near "Swinivicz", upstream of the Iron Gates and was severely damaged.
St. Louis	France	The ship was driven ashore at Flamborough Head. She was refloated the next day and taken in to Bridlington.

== 11 August ==
List of shipwrecks: 11 August 1856
Ship	State	Description
Echo	United States	The ship ran aground on the Dotwick Sand, in the North Sea off the coast of County Durham, United Kingdom. She was refloated.
Gezina van Wielau	Flag unknown	The ship departed from Paimbœuf, Loire-Inférieure for a British port. No further trace, presumed foundered with the loss of all hands.
Henriette	France	The brig collided with the barque Clontarf (United Kingdom) and sank in the North Sea off Blyth, Northumberland, United Kingdom with the loss of six of her eight crew. Survivors were rescued by Clontarf.

== 12 August ==
List of shipwrecks: 12 August 1856
Ship	State	Description
Middleton	United Kingdom	The ship ran aground on the Robin Rigg Sandbank, in the Solway Firth. She was on a voyage from Liverpool, Lancashire to Saint John, New Brunswick, British North America. She was refloated on 14 August with the assistance of two tugs and was towed in to Maryport, Cumberland
Struan	Flag unknown	The brig sprang a leak and was abandoned in the Pacific Ocean. She was on a voyage from Newcastle, New South Wales to Melbourne, Victoria.
Veteran	United Kingdom	The ship ran aground on the Arklow Bank, in the Irish Sea off the coast of County Wicklow. She was on a voyage from Liverpool, Lancashire to Callao, Peru. She was refloated and put back to Liverpool.
Zephyr	United Kingdom	The ship was abandoned in the North Sea. Her crew were rescued before she foundered. She was on a voyage from South Shields, County Durham to Kronstadt, Russia.

== 13 August ==
List of shipwrecks: 13 August 1856
Ship	State	Description
Adieu	United Kingdom	The barque was driven ashore at Cape Ann, Massachusetts. She was on a voyage from the Clyde to Boston, Massachusetts. She had been refloated by 16 August and taken in to Boston.
Blossom	(United Kingdom of Great Britain and Ireland) Grenada	The sloop was driven ashore at Curaçao.
Duroc	French Navy	Duroc The Marceau-class aviso was wrecked on the Mellish Reef, in the Coral Sea 160 leagues (480 nautical miles (890 km)) off the coast of New Caledonia. Her crew sailed to Timor in her 3 boats, plus a boat made from wreckage of the ship "La Deliverance", that took a month to reach, the coast of Australia being held by unfriendly natives.
Henriette	France	The ship collided with Clontarf (United Kingdom) and sank in the North Sea off Blyth, Northumberland, United Kingdom with the loss of six of her eight crew. Survivors were rescued by Clontarf.
Kate	United Kingdom	The brig departed from the Goatzacoalcos River, Mexico for Liverpool, Lancashire. No further trace, presumed foundered with the loss of all hands.
Margaretta	France	The ship was damaged by fire off Bude, Cornwall, United Kingdom. She was on a voyage from the Clyde to Boulogne-sur-Mer. She out in to Padstow, Cornwall.

== 14 August ==
List of shipwrecks: 14 August 1856
Ship	State	Description
RMS Arabia	United Kingdom	The steamship ran aground on the Blonde Rock, off the coast of Seal Island, Nova Scotia, British North America and was damaged. She was on a voyage from Boston, Massachusetts, United States to Liverpool, Lancashire. She put in to Halifax, Nova Scotia in a leaky condition.
Singapore	United Kingdom	The ship sank at "Wanchow", China in a typhoon.
Vulcan	United Kingdom	The schooner was holed by her anchor and sank at Cardigan.

== 15 August ==
List of shipwrecks: 15 August 1856
Ship	State	Description
Boanerges	United Kingdom	The ship ran aground and was damaged at Fleetwood, Lancashire. She was on a voyage from Dalhousie, New Brunswick to Fleetwoog.

== 16 August ==
List of shipwrecks: 16 August 1856
Ship	State	Description
Lively	United Kingdom	The schooner was in collision with the barque Kason (United States)) and a barge and sank in the River Tyne at South Shields, County Durham.

== 18 August ==
List of shipwrecks: 18 August 1856
Ship	State	Description
Baltic	United Kingdom	The brigantine was wrecked on Green Cay. She was on a voyage from New York, United States to Nassau, Bahamas.
Bedale	United Kingdom	The ship was driven ashore and wrecked at Lowestoft, Suffolk. She was on a voyage from Seaham, County Durham to London.
Foam	United Kingdom	The ship ran aground on the Jardinillo Reef. She was on a voyage from Savannah-la-Mar, Jamaica to the Clyde. She was refloated and put in to Havana, Cuba in a leaky condition.
Taliesin	United Kingdom	The steamship ran aground in the River Parrett. She was on a voyage from Cardiff, Glamorgan to Bridgwater, Somerset.

== 19 August ==
List of shipwrecks: 19 August 1856
Ship	State	Description
Stjernen	Prussia	The ship ran aground on the Longsand, in the North Sea off the coast of Essex, United Kingdom. She was on a voyage from Königsberg to Hull, Yorkshire, United Kingdom. she was refloated and resumed her voyage, but consequently put in to King's Lynn, Norfolk, United Kingdom in a leaky condition.

== 20 August ==
List of shipwrecks: 20 August 1856
Ship	State	Description
Eleanor	United Kingdom	The ship was driven ashore at Blakeney, Norfolk. Her crew were rescued. She was on a voyage from Exeter, Devon to Riga, Russia or vice versa.
Elizabeth	United Kingdom	The smack foundered in the Bristol Channel off Barry, Glamorgan. Her crew were rescued by Lilias (United Kingdom). Elizabeth was on a voyage from Aberthaw, Glamorgan to Newport, Monmouthshire.
Four Sisters	United Kingdom	The fishing boat was driven ashore and wrecked between Brighton and Newhaven, Sussex with the loss of all four crew.
Proven	Norway	The schooner was driven ashore at Cap Gris Nez, Pas-de-Calais, France. Her crew were rescued. She was on a voyage from Liverpool, Lancashire, United Kingdom to Copenhagen. Denmark. She was consequently condemned.
Robert and Mary	United Kingdom	The fishing boat was driven ashore and wrecked between Brighton and Newhaven with the loss of all four crew.

== 21 August ==
List of shipwrecks: 21 August 1856
Ship	State	Description
Acme	United Kingdom	The ship was driven ashore on Green Island, British North America. She was on a voyage from the Clyde to Quebec City, Province of Canada, British North America.
Advance	United Kingdom	The ship ran aground on the Middle Ground, in the North Sea off the coast of County Durham. She was refloated the next day.
Elizabeth	United Kingdom	The brigantine sprang a leak and foundered off Land's End, Cornwall. Her crew were rescued by Schyryd (United Kingdom). Elizabeth was on a voyage from Port Talbot, Glamorgan to Plymouth, Devon.
Helen	United Kingdom	The barque was towed in to Stornoway, Isle of Lewis, Outer Hebrides in a derelict condition, having been aground in the "Ferrol Islands".
Metropolitan	United States	The full-rigged ship was driven ashore at Dragør, Denmark. She was declared a total loss.
Salem	Russia	The ship was driven ashore at Harwich, Essex, United Kingdom. She was on a voyage from Sicily to Saint Petersburg. She was refloated the next day.
Voerwarts	Stettin	The brig was abandoned in the English Channel off Beachy Head, Sussex, United Kingdom. Her crew survived. She was on a voyage from Stettin to Cherbourg, Seine-Inférieure, France.
William Francis	United Kingdom	The ship was wrecked at Hordle Cliff, Hampshire. Her crew were rescued. She was on a voyage from Caen, Calvados, France to London.

== 22 August ==
List of shipwrecks: 22 August 1856
Ship	State	Description
Abana	United Kingdom	The ship ran aground on the Annot Bank, in the North Sea off the coast of Forfarshire. She was refloated the next day and put in to Dundee, Forfarshire.
Alarm	United Kingdom	The fishing smack was run down and sunk by a steamship off Herne Bay, Kent. Her three crew were rescued.
Calypso	United Kingdom	The ship ran aground at Kurrachee, India. She was on a voyage from London to Kurrachee.
Countess of Elgin	United Kingdom	The ship was scuttled at Calcutta, India. She had been refloated by 6 October.
Fame	United Kingdom	The ship departed from Quebec City, Province of Canada, British North America for Liverpool, Lancashire. No further trace, presumed foundered with the loss of all hands.
Marie	France	The ship departed from Puerto Plata, Dominican Republic for Hamburg. Presumed subsequently foundered in the Atlantic Ocean; a boat from the ship was discovered on 8 November.
Ross	United Kingdom	The barque was driven ashore in the Gulf of Saint Lawrence. She was on a voyage from Buctouche, New Brunswick, British North America to Hull, Yorkshire. She was consequently condemned.
Virginia	United Kingdom	The schooner ran aground at Donaghadee, County Down and was damaged. She was on a voyage from Ayr to Seville, Spain.

== 24 August ==
List of shipwrecks: 24 August 1856
Ship	State	Description
Hay	United Kingdom	The ship was lost near the mouth of the Eider. Her crew were rescued. She was on a voyage from Newcastle upon Tyne, Northumberland to Hamburg.
Isabella	United Kingdom	The ship was damaged by fire at Milford Haven, Pembrokeshire. She was on a voyage from Cardiff, Glamorgan to Liverpool, Lancashire.
Juan Fernandes	Peru	The ship was sighted in the Atlantic Ocean whilst on a voyage from The Downs to Callao. No further trace, presumed foundered with the loss of all hands.
Viceroy	United Kingdom	The schooner-yacht was run into by the barque James Holmes (United Kingdom) and was abandoned in the English Channel. Her crew were rescued.

== 25 August ==
List of shipwrecks: 25 August 1856
Ship	State	Description
Arthur Eugenie	France	The ship capsized off Cherbourg, Seine-Inférieure. Her crew were rescued. She was on a voyage from Seaham, County Durham, United Kingdom to Cherbourg.
Elizabeth Randle	United Kingdom	The schooner ran aground and sank on the Great Burbo Bank, in Liverpool Bay. Her crew survived. She was on a voyage from Charleston, South Carolina, United States to Liverpool, Lancashire.
Haidee	United Kingdom	The ship ran aground, capsized and was wrecked at Speymouth, Moray. She was on a voyage from Aberdeen to Hartlepool, County Durham. She was refloated on 2 September and taken in to Aberdeen for repairs.
Jay	United Kingdom	The brig was wrecked on a sanbank in the North Sea between the mouths of the Eider and Elbe. Her crew were rescued by a Dutch galiot. She was on a voyage from South Shields, County Durham to Hamburg.
Mary Morris	United Kingdom	The ship departed from New York, United States for the Clyde. No further trace, presumed foundered with the loss of all hands.

== 26 August ==
List of shipwrecks: 26 August 1856
Ship	State	Description
Aid	United Kingdom	The smack was driven ashore at Thurso, Caithness. She was on a voyage from Newcastle upon Tyne, Northumberland to the River Thurso.
Colzium	United Kingdom	The ship ran aground off Helsingør, Denmark. She was on a voyage from Leith, Lothian to Saint Petersburg, Russia.
Rendsburg Compagnie No. 1.	(Denmark) Duchy of Schleswig	The schooner was driven ashore at the mouth of the Eider. She was on a voyage from Newcastle upon Tyne to Rendsburg.
Robert	Prussia	The galeas capsized in the North Sea. Her crew were rescued. She was driven ashore the next day and wrecked at Aulum, Denmark. Robert was on a voyage from Sunderland, County Durham, United Kingdom to Swinemünde.

== 27 August ==
List of shipwrecks: 27 August 1856
Ship	State	Description
Adeline	United Kingdom	The steamship caught fire and sank at Cardiff, Glamorgan.
Despatch	United Kingdom	The ship was wrecked at Foulpoint, Mauritius.
Emigrant	United Kingdom	The ship ran aground on Crawfish Key. She was on a voyage from New Orleans, Louisiana, United States to Liverpool, Lancashire. She was consequently condemned.
Emigrant	United Kingdom	The barque struck a rock and sank at Amoy, Burma. She was on a voyage from Singapore, Straits Settlements to Amoy.
Ivanhoe	United Kingdom	The Southeastern States Hurricane of 1856: The barque was wrecked in a hurricane at Havana, Captaincy General of Cuba.
Pauline	France	The schooner ran aground on the Goodwin Sands, Kent, United Kingdom. She was on a voyage from Newcastle upon Tyne, Northumberland, United Kingdom to Marans, Charente-Inférieure. She was refloated with the assistance of a tug and towed in to Ramsgate, Kent.
Protection	(United Kingdom of Great Britain and Ireland) British North America	The steamship collided with the steamship Boston (United States) and sank in the Saint Lawrence River.

== 28 August ==
List of shipwrecks: 28 August 1856
Ship	State	Description
Custos	United Kingdom	The ship was wrecked on the Creen Rock, in the Isles of Scilly. Her crew were rescued. She was on a voyage from Liverpool, Lancashire to Bonny, Africa.
Evangeline	United Kingdom	The ship ran aground on the Bahama Bank, in the Irish Sea. She was on a voyage from Liverpool to Kronstadt, Russia. She was refloated and resumed her voyage.
Isaac Allerton	United States	The ship foundered in a hurricane 15 nautical miles (28 km) east-southeast of Key West, Florida.
Mersey	United Kingdom	The schooner sank in the North Sea off Filey, Yorkshire. Her four crew were rescued by a fishing yawl. She was on a voyage from Grangemouth, Stirlingshire to Dunkirk, Nord.
Rosine	Hamburg	The galeas collided with the Læsø Lightship (Denmark) and sank with the loss of a crew member. She was on a voyage from Hartlepool, County Durham, United Kingdom to the Duchy of Schlewig.
Sarah	United Kingdom	The brig was wrecked on the Hoften, in the Baltic Sea. She was on a voyage from Liverpool to Narva, Russia.
Tjadda	Netherlands	The koff was driven ashore and wrecked at Alt Skagen, Denmark. Her crew were rescued. She was on a voyage from Inverkeithing, Fife, United Kingdom to Copenhagen, Denmark.
Two Brothers	United Kingdom	The ship was wrecked near the Nakkehead Lighthouse, Denmark with the loss of a crew member. She was on a voyage from Riga, Russia to Newcastle upon Tyne, Northumberland.

== 29 August ==
List of shipwrecks: 29 August 1856
Ship	State	Description
Caroline	Kingdom of Hanover	The schooner was wrecked on Langeoog. Her crew were rescued. She was on a voyage from Newcastle upon Tyne, Northumberland, United Kingdom to "Waverot".
Euralie	United Kingdom	The ship was driven ashore and severely damaged at Dunnegan, Isle of Skye, Outer Hebrides.
Koh-i-Noor	United Kingdom	The steamship was wrecked at Helsingborg, Sweden. Her crew were rescued. She was on a voyage from Liverpool, Lancashire to Saint Petersburg, Russia.
Queen	United Kingdom	The tug was driven ashore on the Saltscar Rocks, on the coast of Yorkshire. She was refloated in a severely leaky condition and made for Redcar, but ran aground on the East Scar Sandbank and sank. Her crew were rescued. She was on a voyage from Scarborough to Middlesbrough.

== 30 August ==
List of shipwrecks: 30 August 1856
Ship	State	Description
Calhoun	United Kingdom	The ship ran aground in the North River. She was on a voyage from New York, United States to Liverpool, Lancashire.
Colonel Clay	United States	The ship was driven ashore in Navy Cove, near Mobile, Alabama.
Madonna	United Kingdom	The brig foundered off the coast of Jutland. She was on a voyage from Hull, Yorkshire to Kronstadt, Russia.
Robert Parker, and Screamer	United States	Robert Parker was driven into the full-rigged ship Screamer at Mobile, Alabama. Both vessels were severely damaged.
Tay	United Kingdom	The paddle steamer was wrecked on Lopez Island, Mexico with the loss of two of her crew. She was on a voyage from Havana, Cuba to Tampico, Mexico.

== 31 August ==
List of shipwrecks: 31 August 1856
Ship	State	Description
Adeline	Duchy of Holstein	The schooner was driven ashore on Skagen, Denmark. Her crew were rescued. She was on a voyage from Hull, Yorkshire, United Kingdom to Flensburg.
Albion	Prussia	The barque was destroyed by fire in the Mediterranean Sea 70 nautical miles (130 km) off Gozo, Malta. Her crew were rescued by the brig Archimede ( Kingdom of Sardinia). Albion was on a voyage from Constantinople, Ottoman Empire to an English port.
John Currier	United Kingdom	The ship was abandoned in the Atlantic Ocean. Her crew were rescued by the steamship Nashville (United States), which took John Currier in tow, but the tow was subsequently abandoned. She came ashore 40 nautical miles (74 km) south of Cape Henelopen, Delaware, United States. John Currier was on a voyage from Mobile, Alabama, United States to Falmouth, Cornwall.
Star	United Kingdom	The tug was driven onto the Saltscar Rocks, on the coast of Yorkshire. She was refloated but consequently sank off Redcar, Yorkshire. Her crew were rescued. She was on a voyage from Scarborough to Middlesbrough. Star was refloated on 4 September and taken in to Middlesbrough in a severely damaged condition.

== Unknown date ==
List of shipwrecks: Unknown date in August 1856
Ship	State	Description
Amoy	United Kingdom	The ship was abandoned in the Atlantic Ocean before 23 August. her crew were rescued by Cap Rouge ( (United Kingdom of Great Britain and Ireland) British North America). Amoy was on a voyage from Quebec City, Province of Canada, British North America to Bristol, Gloucestershire.
Brevig	Sweden	The ship was wrecked at Grisslehamn before 2 August. She was on a voyage from Gävle to London, United Kingdom.
Carmelite	Hamburg	The schooner was wrecked in the Quillemane River, Madagascar before 28 August.
Cashmere	United Kingdom	The ship was abandoned in the English Channel off the Isle of Wight on or before 21 August. Her crew were rescued by a steamship. She was on a voyage from Riga, Russia to Plymouth, Devon. Cashmere came ashore at St. Catherine's Point, Isle of Wight on 22 August and was wrecked. The wreck was subsequently taken in to Yarmouth, Isle of Wight.
Challenger	United Kingdom	The ship was driven ashore in the Wusong River.
Clarendon	United Kingdom	The transport ship sprang a leak in the Mediterranean Sea before 8 August. some of her troops were taken off by a French vessel. She was then beached near Gibraltar.
Colombo	United Kingdom	The ship was wrecked at the Sand Heads, India before 27 August.
Contest	United Kingdom	The ship ran aground on the Carysfort Reef. She was on a voyage from Laguna to Liverpool, Lancashire. She was refloated.
Coronet	United States	The ship ran aground on the Florida Reef. She was on a voyage from New Orleans, Louisiana to Liverpool. She was refloated and resumed her voyage, but consequently put in to New York on 12 August in a severely leaky condition.
Flora	Norway	The barque ran aground on the Brandy Pots, in the Saint Lawrence River. She was on a voyage from Quebec City, Province of Canada, British North America to London. She was refloated and towed back to Quebec City, where she arrived on 16 August.
Frank Horton	United States	The brig was wrecked west of Bahía Honda, Cuba before 5 August.
Gloriosa	United Kingdom	The ship was driven ashore on the French coast. She was on a voyage from London to Calcutta, India. She was refloated and taken in to Plymouth in a leaky condition, arriving on 21 August.
Harpooner	United Kingdom	The barque struck a sunken rock near Ningpo, China and was damaged. She was on a voyage from Amoy, Burma to Ningpo. She was consequently condemned.
James	United Kingdom	The ship was abandoned off Cape Farewell, Greenland before 3 August.
J. Bailey	United Kingdom	The schooner was driven ashore near Lovells Island, Massachusetts, United States before 22 August.
Jessie Thoms	United Kingdom	The ship ran aground on the Dvalegrund, or Saaremaa, Russia before 14 August. She was on a voyage from Riga, Russia to Leith, Lothian. She was refloated and resumed her voyage.
John Heyes	United Kingdom	The ship was capsized and was wrecked at Shadwell, Middlesex in mid-August. She was righted on 10 September. She was declared a total loss and broken up.
"Kossuth"	United States	The boat left Gloucester, Massachusetts and vanished during the latter part of the month, possibly run down. Lost with both crewmen.
Linwood	United Kingdom	The ship was driven ashore on Kent Island, Maryland, United States. She was on a voyage from Liverpool to Baltimore, Maryland. She was refloated and taken in to Baltimore.
Marcia Greenleaf	United Kingdom	The ship ran aground at the mouth of the South West Passage, Mississippi River. She was on a voyage from Liverpool to New Orleans.
Maria Smit	(United Kingdom of Great Britain and Ireland) Cape Colony	The ship was driven ashore and wrecked in Lambert's Bay before 29 August. Her crew were rescued.
Mary Gibson	United Kingdom	The ship ran aground at the mouth of the Danube before 21 August.
Queen Victoria	United Kingdom	The ship ran aground on the Ooster Sandbank, in the North Sea off the coast of the Netherlands. She was on a voyage from South Shields, County Durham to Hellevoetsluis, Zeeland, Netherlands. She was refloated but ran aground on the Slikken Sandbank. She was again refloated and taken in to Hellevoetsluis, arriving on 27 August.
Rover	United Kingdom	The ship ran aground on the Button Rocks, in the Irish Sea off the coast of County Wexford before 28 August.
Terror	United Kingdom	The barque was wrecked on the Isle of Pines, Cuba. Her crew were rescued. She was on a voyage from Sydney, New South Wales to the Isle of Pines.
Totnes Packet	United Kingdom	The ship was driven ashore and damaged at Dartmouth, Devon. She was refloated on 21 August.
Wanderer	(United Kingdom of Great Britain and Ireland) Cape Colony	The schooner was wrecked in Plettenberg Bay before 15 August.
Zeemieuw	Belgium	The ship foundered in the Mediterranean Sea off Malta before 21 August. Her crew were rescued.
