= 1932 Freeport hurricane =

Category 4 Atlantic hurricane in 1932

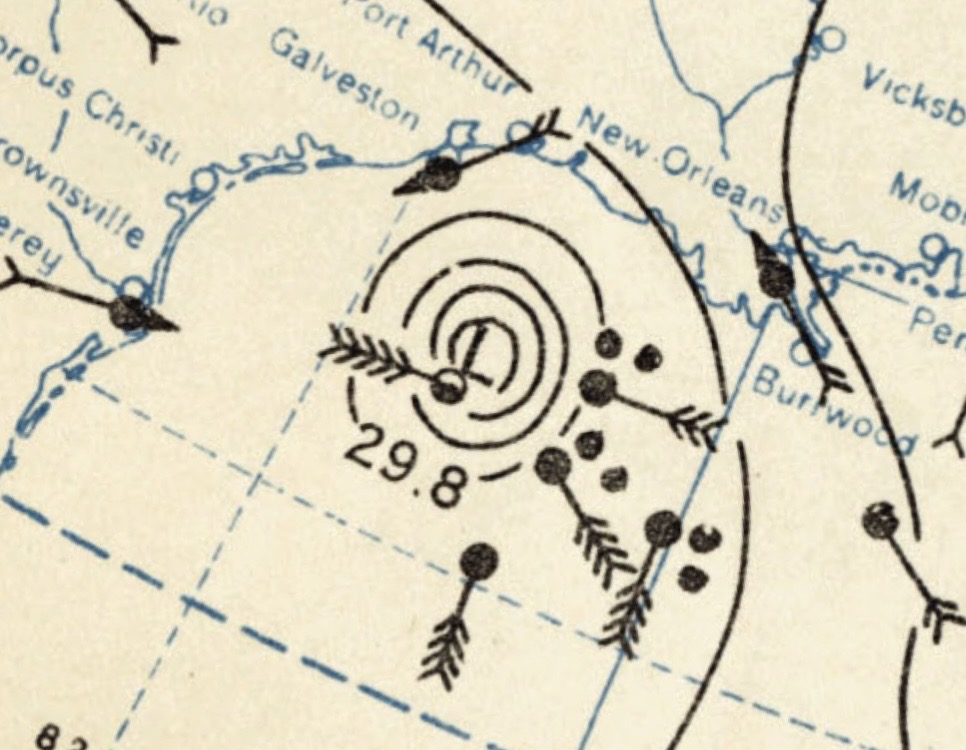
- Surface weather analysis of the hurricane approaching landfall in southeast Texas on August 13

Meteorological history
- Formed: August 12, 1932
- Dissipated: August 15, 1932

Category 4 major hurricane
- 1-minute sustained (SSHWS/NWS)
- Highest winds: 150 mph (240 km/h)
- Lowest pressure: 935 mbar (hPa); 27.61 inHg

Overall effects
- Fatalities: 40
- Damage: $7.5 million (1932 USD)
- Areas affected: South Central U.S.
- IBTrACS
- Part of the 1932 Atlantic hurricane season

The 1932 Freeport hurricane was an intense tropical cyclone that primarily affected areas of the Texas coast in August of the 1932 Atlantic hurricane season. It was the second storm and first hurricane of the season, developing just off the Yucatán Peninsula on August 12. While moving to the northwest, the storm began to quickly intensify the next day. It rapidly intensified from a category 1 hurricane to a category 4 with winds estimated at 150 mph (240 km/h) and an estimated central pressure of 935 mbar (27.6 inHg) shortly before making landfall near Freeport, Texas, early on August 14. After landfall, the hurricane began to quickly weaken before dissipating over the Texas Panhandle.

The storm caused heavy rainfall inland, peaking at 9.93 in (252 mm) in Angleton. Record rainfall rates were also reported in some areas. Power outages were reported in Galveston and San Antonio. The storm caused $7.5 million in damages, (Note: All damage totals are in 1932 United States dollars unless otherwise noted.) mostly to crops, and 40 deaths.

== Meteorological history ==
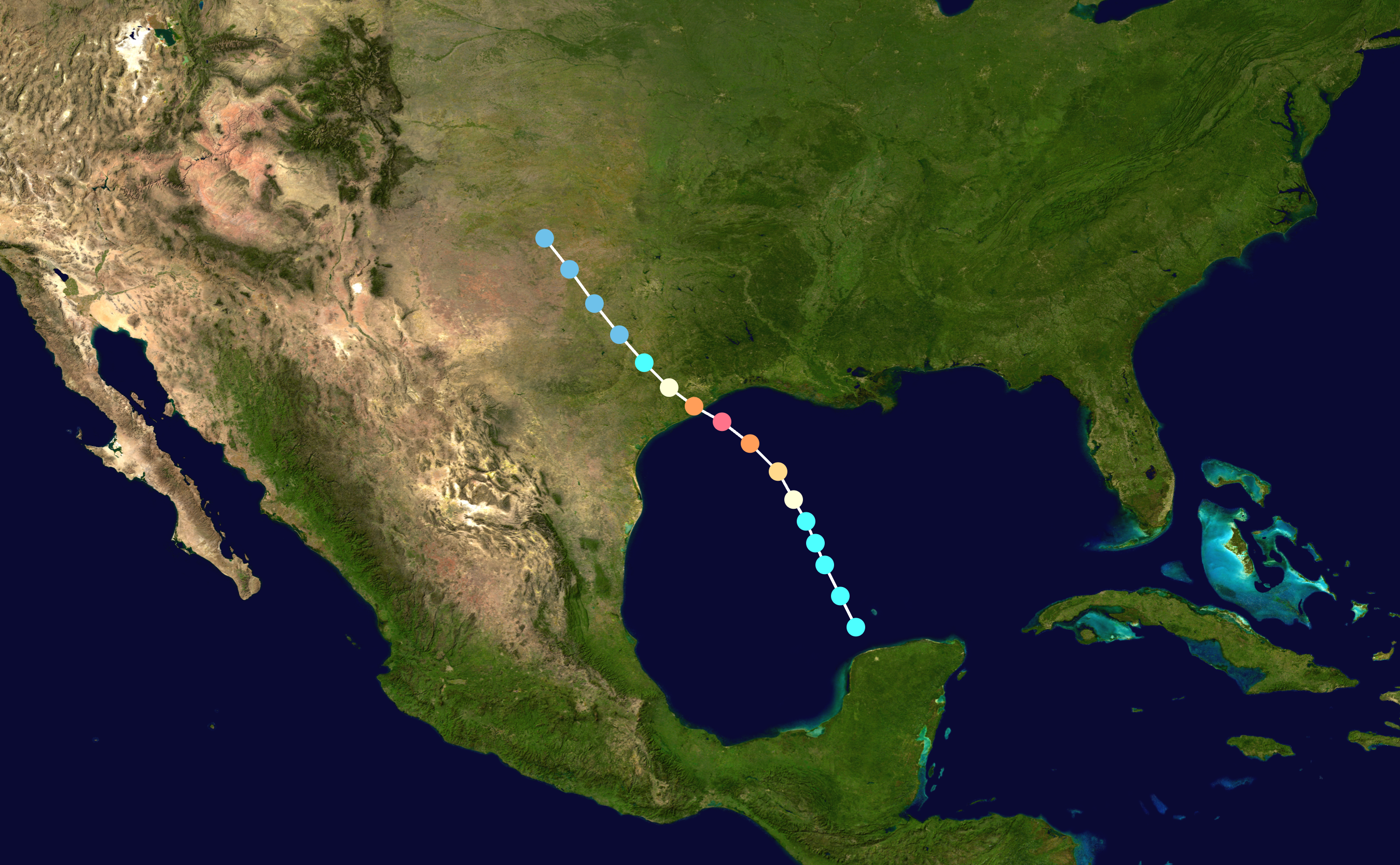
Map plotting the storm's track and intensity, according to the Saffir–Simpson scale Map key Saffir–Simpson scale Tropical depression (≤38 mph, ≤62 km/h) Tropical storm (39–73 mph, 63–118 km/h) Category 1 (74–95 mph, 119–153 km/h) Category 2 (96–110 mph, 154–177 km/h) Category 3 (111–129 mph, 178–208 km/h) Category 4 (130–156 mph, 209–251 km/h) Category 5 (≥157 mph, ≥252 km/h) Unknown Storm type Tropical cyclone Subtropical cyclone Extratropical cyclone, remnant low, tropical disturbance, or monsoon depression

The Freeport hurricane was first noted by ships on August 12 as a tropical disturbance in the Gulf of Mexico. However, it was suggested in later research that the disturbance may have originated from a low-pressure area between Belize and Honduras on August 11. Steadily moving to the northwest, the storm began to intensify, reaching hurricane strength on August 13, and soon after reaching major hurricane strength later that day. A report remarked that the storm was "phenomenal" due to the fact that previously the storm had "seemed to be of only moderate intensity" while near land before rapidly intensifying.

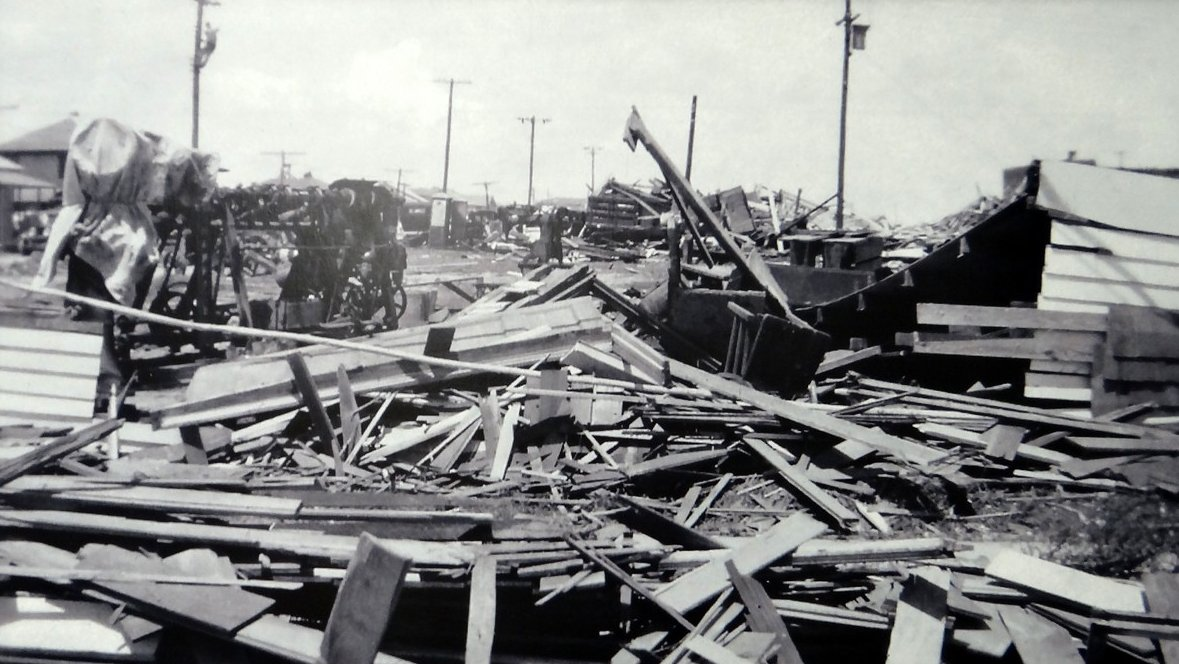
Destruction in Freeport after the hurricane

The storm eventually reached winds of 145 mph (233 km/h), making it a Category 4 hurricane on the Saffir–Simpson scale. The hurricane proceeded to make landfall early on August 14 just east of Freeport with winds of 150 mph (240 km/h). A ship just offshore of the coast reported a minimum pressure of 942 mbar (27.8 inHg), but the official estimate for the hurricane's landfall intensity was set to 935 mbar (27.6 inHg) given the fact that the system was still rapidly intensifying at the time. Due to the storm's small size, it quickly weakened to tropical storm strength later that day. The storm finally weakened into a tropical depression before dissipating the next day over the Texas Panhandle.

== Preparations, impact, and aftermath ==
Strongest landfalling Atlantic U.S. hurricanes^{†}
Rank	Name^{‡}	Season	Wind speed	
Rank	Name^{‡}	Season	mph	km/h
1	"Labor Day"	1935	185	295
2	Camille	1969	175	280
3	Andrew	1992	165	270
4	"San Felipe II"*	1928	160	260
4	Michael	2018	160	260
6	Maria	2017	155	250
7	"Last Island"	1856	150	240
7	"Indianola"	1886	150	240
7	"Florida Keys"	1919	150	240
7	"Freeport"	1932	150	240
7	Charley	2004	150	240
7	Laura	2020	150	240
7	Ida	2021	150	240
7	Ian	2022	150	240
Source: NHC, AOML/HRD
^{†}Strength refers to maximum sustained wind speed upon striking land.
^{‡}Systems prior to 1950 were not officially named.
*Name given to the storm at its peak landfall.

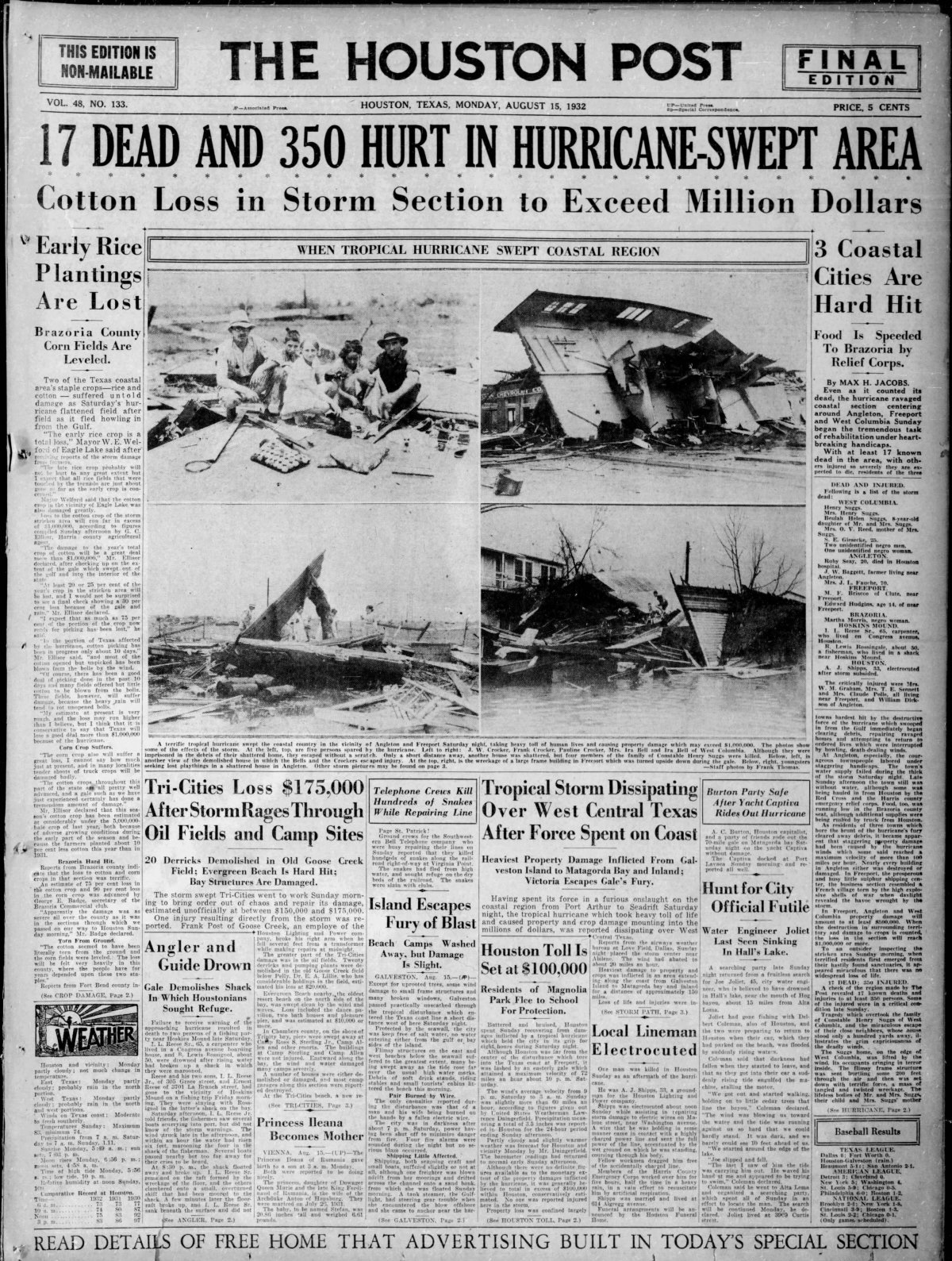
Front Page of the Houston Post on August 15, covering the aftermath of the hurricane

In preparation for the storm, 150 vehicles evacuated out of Freeport, while water craft were taken up the Brazos River as far inland as possible. 100 families in Caplen and Gilchrist were also evacuated. The 38th division of the Texas National Guard, stationed in Palacios, was alerted due to the oncoming storm. Heavy rainfall occurred across the coast and further inland due to the storm. Four locations set 24-hour rainfall records for the month of August, the highest of which was set near Angleton, recording 9.93 in (252 mm) of rain on August 13. Angleton also faced a water shortage after its pumping station was destroyed. The remnants of the storm produced as much as 12 in (300 mm) of rain in Oklahoma. Occupants in four vehicles were rescued by the United States Coast Guard near San Luis Pass.

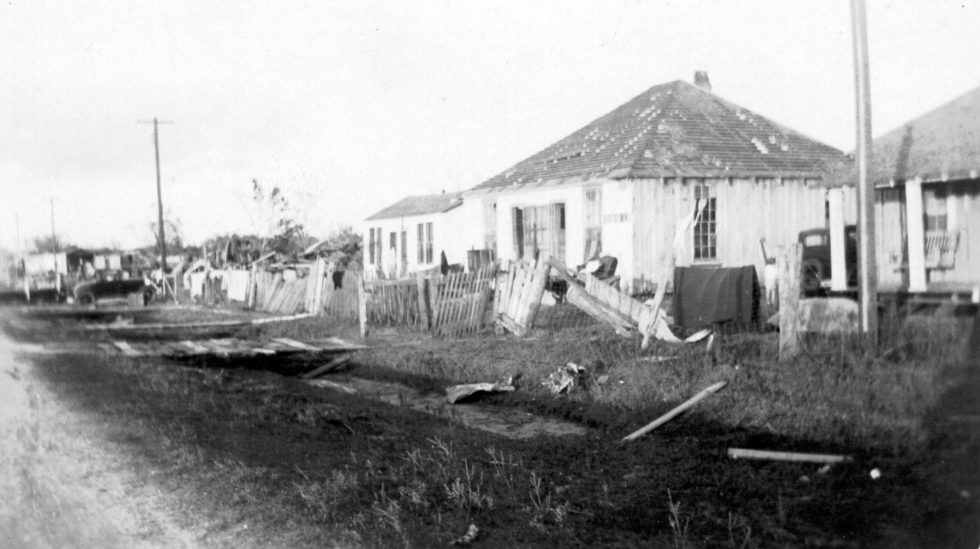
Damage to homes after the storm in Freeport

In Wharton, 800 birds went missing in the heavy rain. Galveston suffered primarily wind damage in the form of unroofed structures and broken windows. The Galveston Causeway was flooded by the heavy rain, preventing access from Galveston Island to the mainland. Several other roads were blocked by fallen trees. The city was also affected by a power outage after the storm caused loss of power and damaged communication lines. In addition, communication lines in San Antonio were damaged.

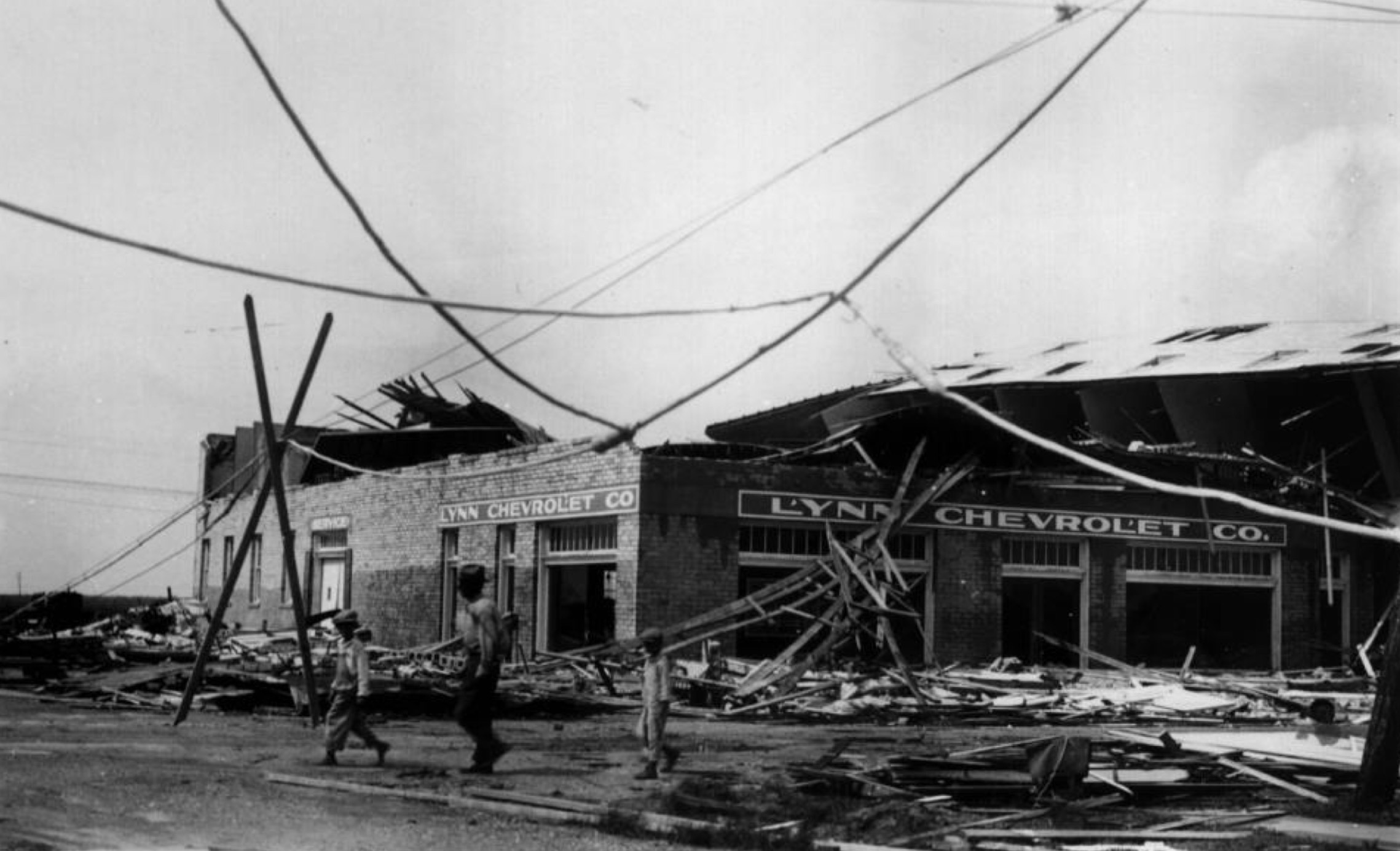
The Lynn’s Chevrolet in Freeport destroyed by the hurricane

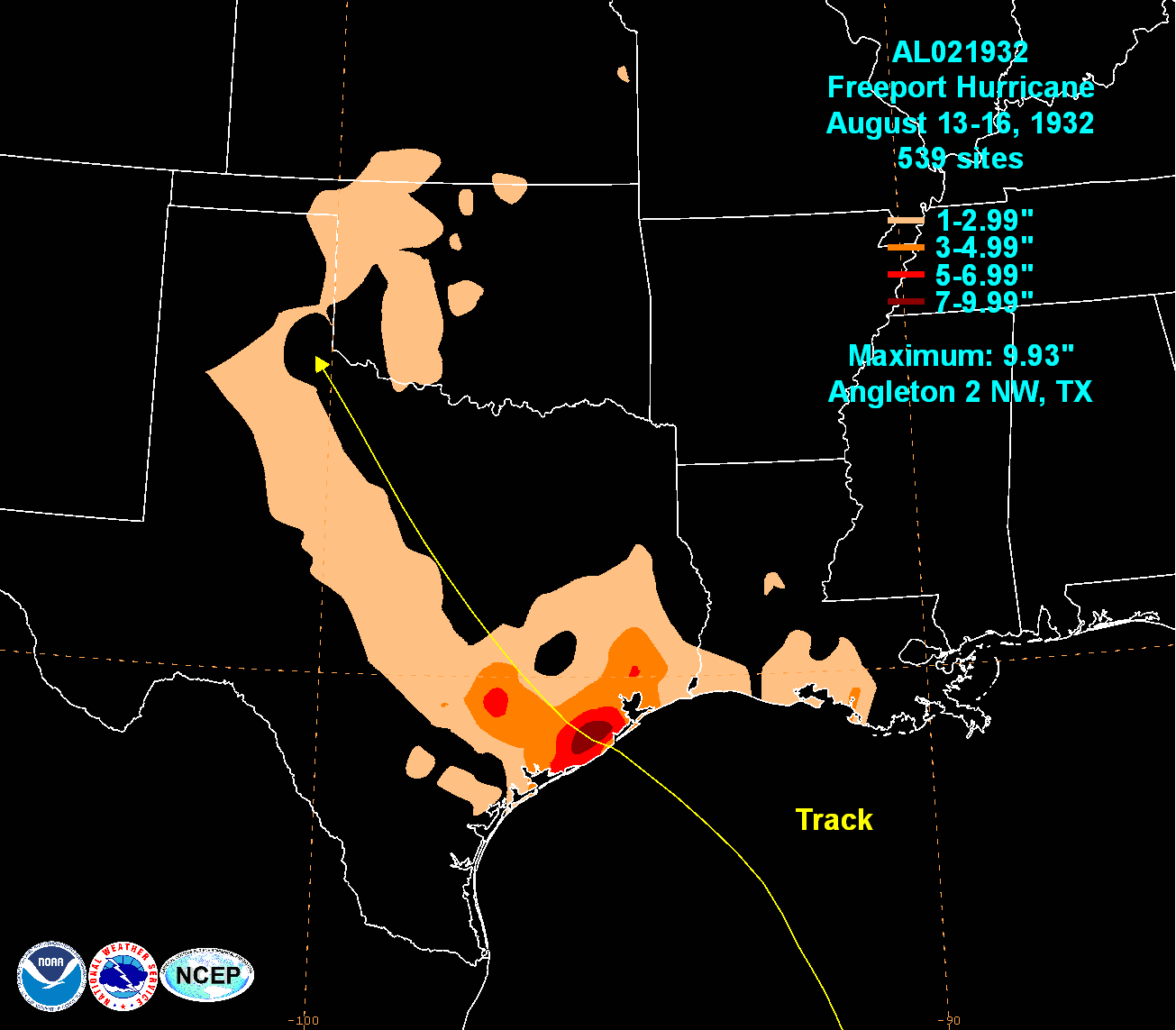
Map of the total rainfall in the United States from the hurricane

At William P. Hobby Airport in Houston, 11 planes were damaged when a hangar collapsed, resulting in losses of $250,000. Hermann Park was also affected by the storm, where nine goats began to roam within the park due to a broken fence caused by a fallen limb. 35 convicts were freed from the Ramsey Unit state prison during the storm due to the chance of the prison collapsing. However, after the storm, only eight returned to the prison, leaving 27 others missing.

After the storm, the American Red Cross brought supplies to areas affected by the hurricane, requesting as much as $10,000 in relief work. Several other local relief committees also brought supplies to affected areas. An estimated $2 million in damages from the storm were attributed to crop damage alone, especially rice and cotton. The storm was estimated to have killed 40 people and caused $7.5 million in damage.

== See also ==
- 1941 Texas hurricane
- 1949 Texas hurricane
- Hurricane Harvey
- List of Texas hurricanes (1900–49)
