= 1856 Last Island hurricane =

Category 4 Atlantic hurricane

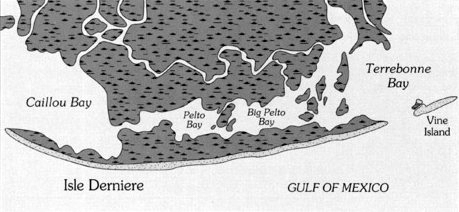
- Map of Last Island, Louisiana in 1853

Meteorological history
- Formed: Unknown
- Dissipated: August 12, 1856

Category 4 major hurricane
- 1-minute sustained (SSHWS/NWS)
- Highest winds: 150 mph (240 km/h)
- Lowest pressure: 934 mbar (hPa); 27.58 inHg

Overall effects
- Fatalities: 300+
- Areas affected: Louisiana and southwestern Mississippi
- IBTrACS
- Part of the 1856 Atlantic hurricane season

The 1856 Last Island hurricane (also known as the Great Storm of 1856) was a deadly and destructive tropical cyclone that is tied with 2020's Hurricane Laura and 2021's Hurricane Ida as the strongest hurricane on record to make landfall in the U.S. state of Louisiana, as measured by maximum sustained winds. The first known tropical cyclone of 1856 Atlantic hurricane season, it was observed first as a minimal hurricane in the Gulf of Mexico near Dry Tortugas on August 9. Moving northwestward, the cyclone quickly intensified into a strong Category 4 hurricane on the modern-day Saffir–Simpson scale by the following day. Late on August 10, the hurricane made landfall on Last Island, Louisiana, with winds at 150 mph (240 km/h), hours before striking near New Iberia. The system rapidly weakened after moving inland, falling to tropical storm intensity on August 11. The storm would be last noted over Mississippi on the next day.

Offshore, at least 183 people drowned after steamers and schooners sank in rough seas produced by the hurricane. A storm surge between 11 and 12 feet (3.4 and 3.7 m) completely submerged Last Island in Louisiana, destroying virtually every structure, including the hotels and casinos, while all crops were ruined. Additionally, Last Island itself was split in two. Inland, heavy rainfall caused the Mermentau River to flood, destroying crops and every house in Abbeville. The storm produced as much as 13.14 inches (334 mm) of precipitation in New Orleans. In Plaquemines Parish, rice fields were under several feet of water, while many orange trees lost their fruit. Overall, the hurricane resulted in at least 300 fatalities.

== Meteorological history ==
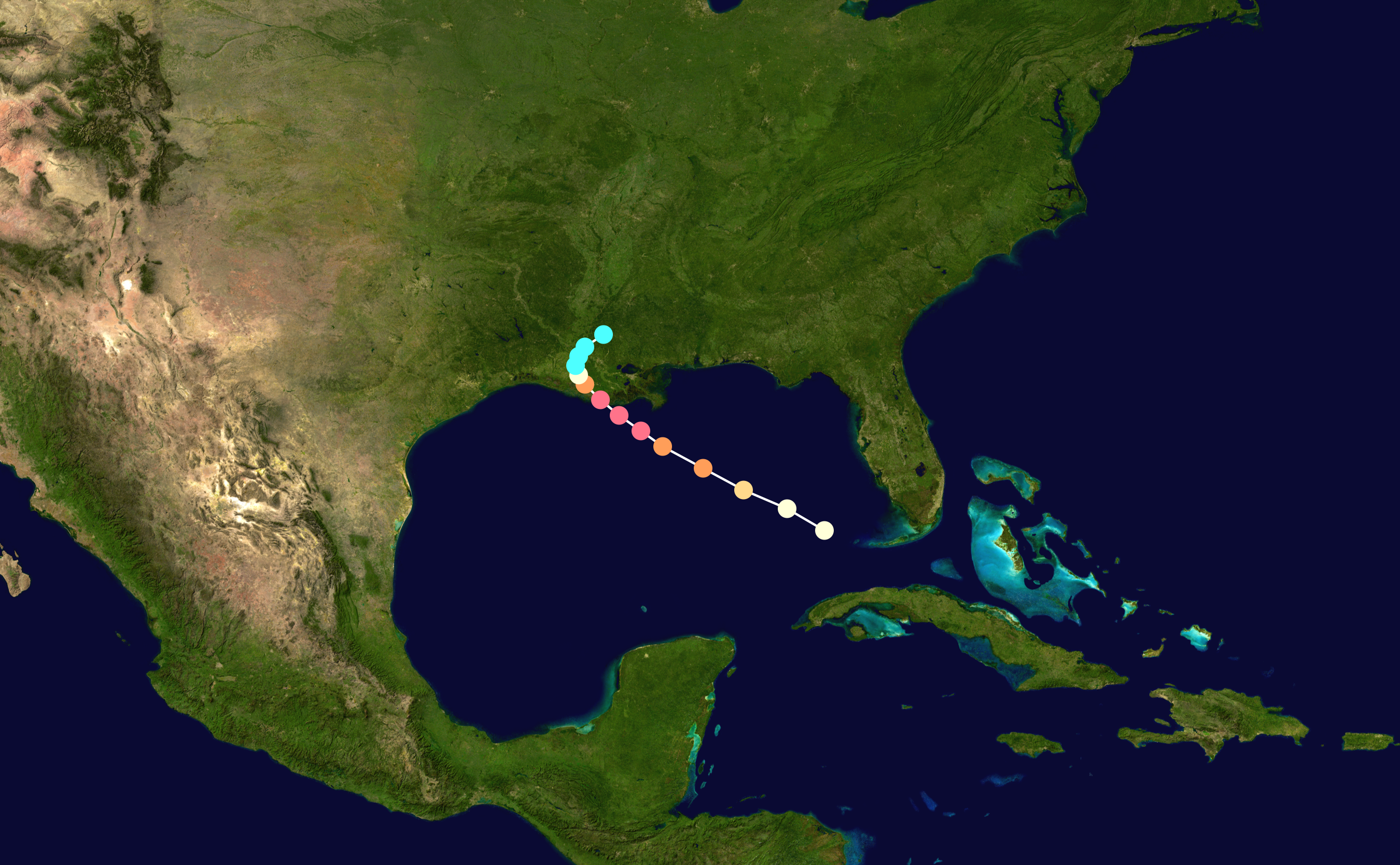
Map plotting the storm's track and intensity, according to the Saffir–Simpson scale Map key Saffir–Simpson scale Tropical depression (≤38 mph, ≤62 km/h) Tropical storm (39–73 mph, 63–118 km/h) Category 1 (74–95 mph, 119–153 km/h) Category 2 (96–110 mph, 154–177 km/h) Category 3 (111–129 mph, 178–208 km/h) Category 4 (130–156 mph, 209–251 km/h) Category 5 (≥157 mph, ≥252 km/h) Unknown Storm type Tropical cyclone Subtropical cyclone Extratropical cyclone, remnant low, tropical disturbance, or monsoon depression

The cyclone was first detected in the eastern Gulf of Mexico 125 miles (201 km) west-northwest of Key West, Florida, on August 8, 1856. Because it was already a hurricane when it was first observed, it probably had developed further east than here. It advanced steadily northwest, strengthening to the equivalent of a Category 3 hurricane. The hurricane gradually slowed prior to landfall on August 10, and it attained its estimated peak intensity of 150 mph (240 km/h). It was a tropical cyclone of small diameter, and its maximum sustained winds may have reached Category 5 status, but were unrecorded. During the early evening of August 10 the northeastern edge of the eye crossed over Last Island (Official name: Isle Dernière) before making landfall a few hours later south of New Iberia, Louisiana. The cyclone is believed to have struck southern Louisiana at peak intensity with an approximate central pressure of 934 mbar (27.6 inHg). A ship reported a peripheral pressure of 955 mbar (28.2 inHg), so a lower pressure was based on the small size of the hurricane. It quickly weakened over land, and it diminished to a tropical storm on August 11. It dissipated over southwestern Mississippi on August 12 with fully tropical characteristics.

== Impact and aftermath ==
=== Last Island ===
Strongest landfalling Atlantic U.S. hurricanes^{†}
Rank	Name^{‡}	Season	Wind speed	
Rank	Name^{‡}	Season	mph	km/h
1	"Labor Day"	1935	185	295
2	Camille	1969	175	280
3	Andrew	1992	165	270
4	"San Felipe II"*	1928	160	260
4	Michael	2018	160	260
6	Maria	2017	155	250
7	"Last Island"	1856	150	240
7	"Indianola"	1886	150	240
7	"Florida Keys"	1919	150	240
7	"Freeport"	1932	150	240
7	Charley	2004	150	240
7	Laura	2020	150	240
7	Ida	2021	150	240
7	Ian	2022	150	240
Source: NHC, AOML/HRD
^{†}Strength refers to maximum sustained wind speed upon striking land.
^{‡}Systems prior to 1950 were not officially named.
*Name given to the storm at its peak landfall.

Many Last Island vacationers hoping to escape the approaching storm were awaiting the scheduled arrival of the ship Star, which provided regular service to the mainland. However, the Star was blown off course, barely escaping sailing into the open gulf, directly into the hurricane, where it would have almost certainly been lost. Passenger Tom Ellis, an experienced captain in local waters, and a few other passengers observed the ship was off course. Ellis alerted Captain Abe Smith, who corrected the course and barely making headway against the winds, managed to pull into the channel behind the hotel. The Star was swept, crashing into shore and beached on the sand, where it stayed through the storm.

Visibility during the storm was extremely limited and eyes were blasted by sand until water covered the beaches. Sometime between 4:00 and 5:00 PM, the storm surge occurred suddenly, with the water rising several feet in a matter of minutes. The storm surge submerged the entire island and destroyed all of the buildings. The hotel, which held many women and children on the second floor and men on the first, collapsed, crushing many and sweeping others out to sea.

Several survivors managed to make their way to the hull of the Star. By tying himself with a rope to the Star, Captain Abe Smith was able to rescue at least 40 people from the storm surge. The Star would serve as a shelter for the survivors until rescuers arrived three days later. Early reports had it that at least 182 Star passengers were killed.

Many managed to survive by sheltering in or behind overturned cisterns, which were large wooden cylindrical tanks reinforced with iron hoops. Some clung to the raised foundations of the cisterns and a few to trees. A dozen people survived by clinging to a large piece of rotating playground equipment atop a levee. Many people floated on debris, including wall sections, logs and furniture. A sturdy wooden enclosure that held large terrapins, a regional delicacy, provided enough protection to save several individuals. Another group survived by burying their feet in the sand and holding hands. Some survivors were carried to the marshes on the mainland, although some perished from injuries or lack of food and water.

Of the approximately 400 vacationers on the island, 198 were known or presumed dead and 203 were known survivors. Dixon (2009) provides lists of survivors and the dead.

Several of the victims were enslaved people. Some of the enslaved people were credited with rescuing others, including several children.

The tragedy had a major impact on the planter society, which lost many members. At the time of the hurricane approximately two-thirds of the millionaires in the U.S. lived in Louisiana, many of those being plantation owners, especially sugar growers. Of the social group affected, many were friends, acquaintances, or related by marriage or known through business.

The family home of three of the Last Island casualties was Shadows-on-the-Teche in New Iberia, Louisiana, now a National Historic Landmark. Mrs. Frances Weeks (Magill) Pruett and her children Mary Ida Magill and Augustine Magill died in the natural disaster. The two children were buried in the plantation's cemetery.

The island itself was split into the Last Islands (Isles Dernieres). The island reportedly stayed submerged for several days before parts of it re-emerged as large sandbars. After the storm surge, the remains of the Star were the only sign that an island had ever existed there. Presently, the area is the Isles Dernieres Barrier Islands Refuge owned and managed by the Louisiana Department of Wildlife and Fisheries to provide protected nesting grounds for pelicans and other waterbirds.

=== Elsewhere ===
The following are the numbers of deaths offshore:

Steamer Nautilus: 85
Steamer Manilla: 13
Schooner Ellen: 15
Other losses at sea: 20

On Calliou Island, which was located near Last Island, four homes were destroyed, and the others suffered substantial damage. Tides generated by the storm capsized two boats and swept away stock. The city of New Orleans was inundated with 13.14 inches (334 mm) of rain. Every building in Abbeville was destroyed, including St. Mary Magdalen Church. Crops along the Mermentau River suffered large losses from freshwater flooding. Farther east, storm surge and abnormally high tides left some sections of Plaquemines Parish inundated by several feet of water, resulting in a near-total loss of rice crops. Severe losses to orange crops were reported in the area. Extensive damage occurred in St. Tammany Parish at Lewisburg, Mandeville, and other areas near the Tchefuncte River. The storm swept away bathhouses and wharves, while also downing fences, trees, and vegetation.

== In print ==
The disaster became national news as soon as three survivors salvaged a small boat and sailed to the mainland for help.

In addition to the several firsthand accounts, the story of Last Island has been republished periodically. The list below includes only a few versions:

- In 1871, Harper's New Monthly had a story about the capsizing of the steamer Nautilus and Jim Frisbee, the ship's second steward, the only survivor.
- Lafcadio Hearn's novel Chita: A Memory of Last Island (1889), based on the Last Island hurricane of 1856, was a popular story when published; however, it either created or perpetuated several myths about the tragedy. One of the main sources of Hearn's novel was identified as the account written by Iberville Parish sugar planter Michael Schlatre. After publication of Chita, Michael Schlatre's document became lost after being borrowed and not returned. The document was recovered during 1936, when it was found in the Iberville Parish courthouse in Plaquemine, La.
- Bill Dixon's Last Days of Last Island (2009) was written using information from various archives in an attempt to be historically accurate. The numerous references include a newspaper article, a few books, and accounts of the survivors, many of whom are quoted.

== See also ==
- List of Category 4 Atlantic hurricanes
- List of Louisiana hurricanes
- 1855 Gulf Shore hurricane – A category 3 hurricane that struck Louisiana the year prior.
- Hurricane Andrew – A similar tracking hurricane that struck the same area 136 years later.
- Hurricane Katrina – A intense, destructive, and deadly Louisiana hurricane that caused a humanitarian crisis in 2005.
