= 1856 Atlantic hurricane season =

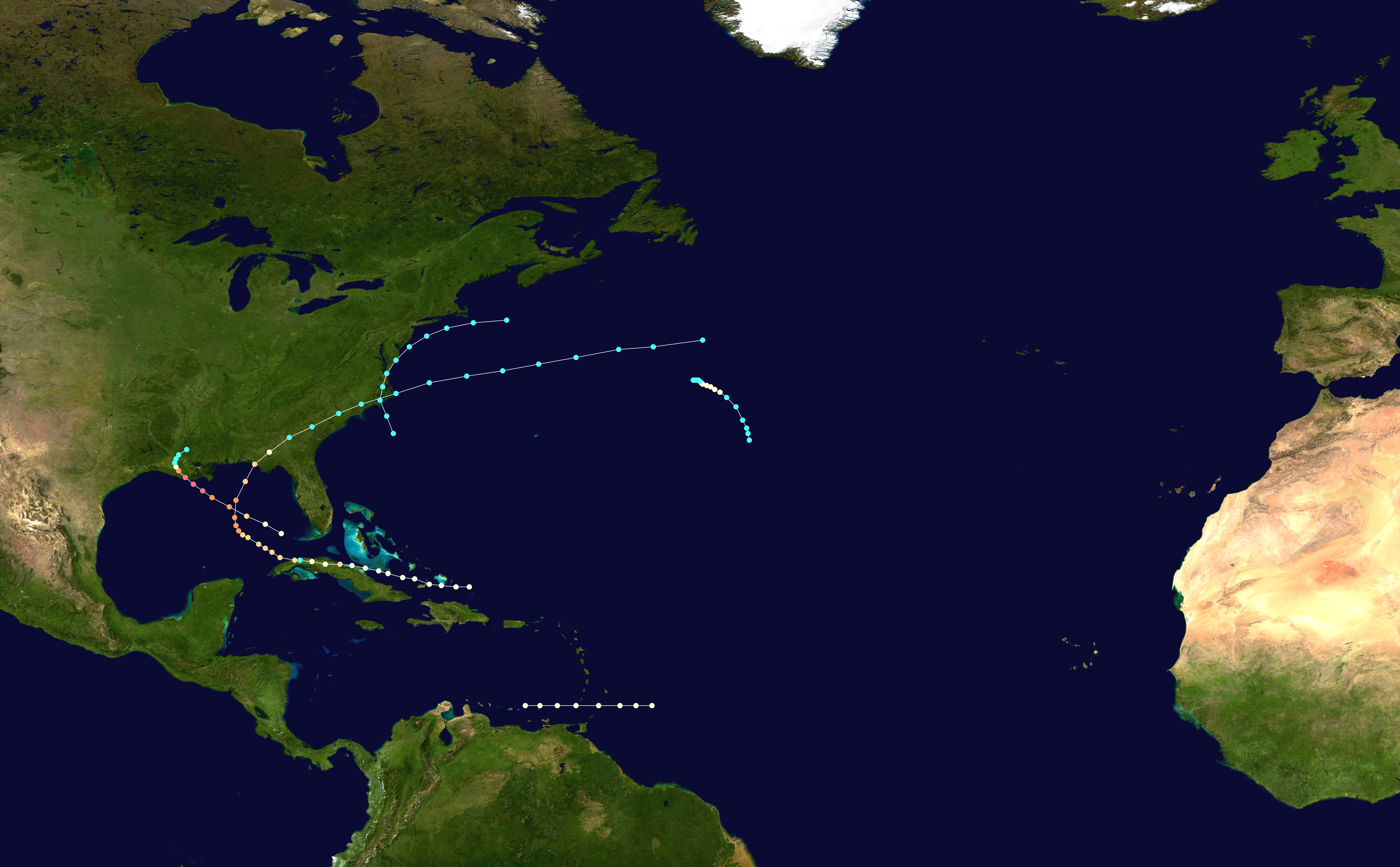
- Season summary map

Seasonal boundaries
- First system formed: August 9, 1856
- Last system dissipated: September 22, 1856

Strongest storm
- Name: One
  - Maximum winds: 150 mph (240 km/h) (1-minute sustained)
  - Lowest pressure: 934 mbar (hPa; 27.58 inHg)

Seasonal statistics
- Total storms: 6
- Hurricanes: 4
- Major hurricanes (Cat. 3+): 2
- Total fatalities: ≥400 total
- Total damage: Unknown

The 1856 Atlantic hurricane season was a deadly Atlantic hurricane season that featured six tropical cyclones. The first system, 1856 Last Island hurricane, was first observed in the Gulf of Mexico on August 9. The final storm, Hurricane Six, was last observed on September 22. These dates fall within the period with the most tropical cyclone activity in the Atlantic. The season also had an accumulated cyclone energy (ACE) rating of 48.96. (Note: There is an undercount bias of Accumulated Cyclone Energy (ACE) before the satellite era (prior to the mid–1960s), due to the difficulty of identifying storms.) Only two tropical cyclones during the season existed simultaneously. Five of them struck land, while one of the cyclones has only a single known point in its track due to a sparsity of data. Operationally, another tropical cyclone was believed to have existed in the Wilmington, North Carolina, area in September, but HURDAT – the official Atlantic hurricane database – excludes this system. Another tropical cyclone that existed over the Northeastern United States in mid-August was later added to HURDAT.

Four tropical cyclones reached hurricane status, including two which became major hurricanes, Category 3 or higher on the modern-day Saffir–Simpson hurricane wind scale. However, in the absence of modern satellite and other remote-sensing technologies, only storms that affected populated land areas or encountered ships at sea are currently known, so the actual total could be higher. An undercount bias of zero to six tropical cyclones per year between 1851 and 1885 has been estimated. The strongest cyclone of the season struck Louisiana at peak intensity, with sustained winds of 150 mph (240 km/h). This was the strongest hurricane, in terms of sustained winds, to strike the state until Laura and Ida tied it in 2020 and 2021 respectively. It also - the 1856 Last Island hurricane - brought devastation to southern Louisiana. At least than 400 people were killed after a storm surge submerged Last Island, making it one of the deadliest hurricanes in Louisiana history. Hurricane Two brought heavy rains and squalls to Barbados and Grenada, causing "considerable" damage. Tropical Storms Three and Four had a minor impact on the Northeastern United States and Cuba, respectively. Additionally, Hurricane Five caused four deaths in Inagua, Bahamas and had a minor impact on Cuba and the United States.

== Systems ==
=== Hurricane One ===
- Category 4 hurricane (SSHWS)
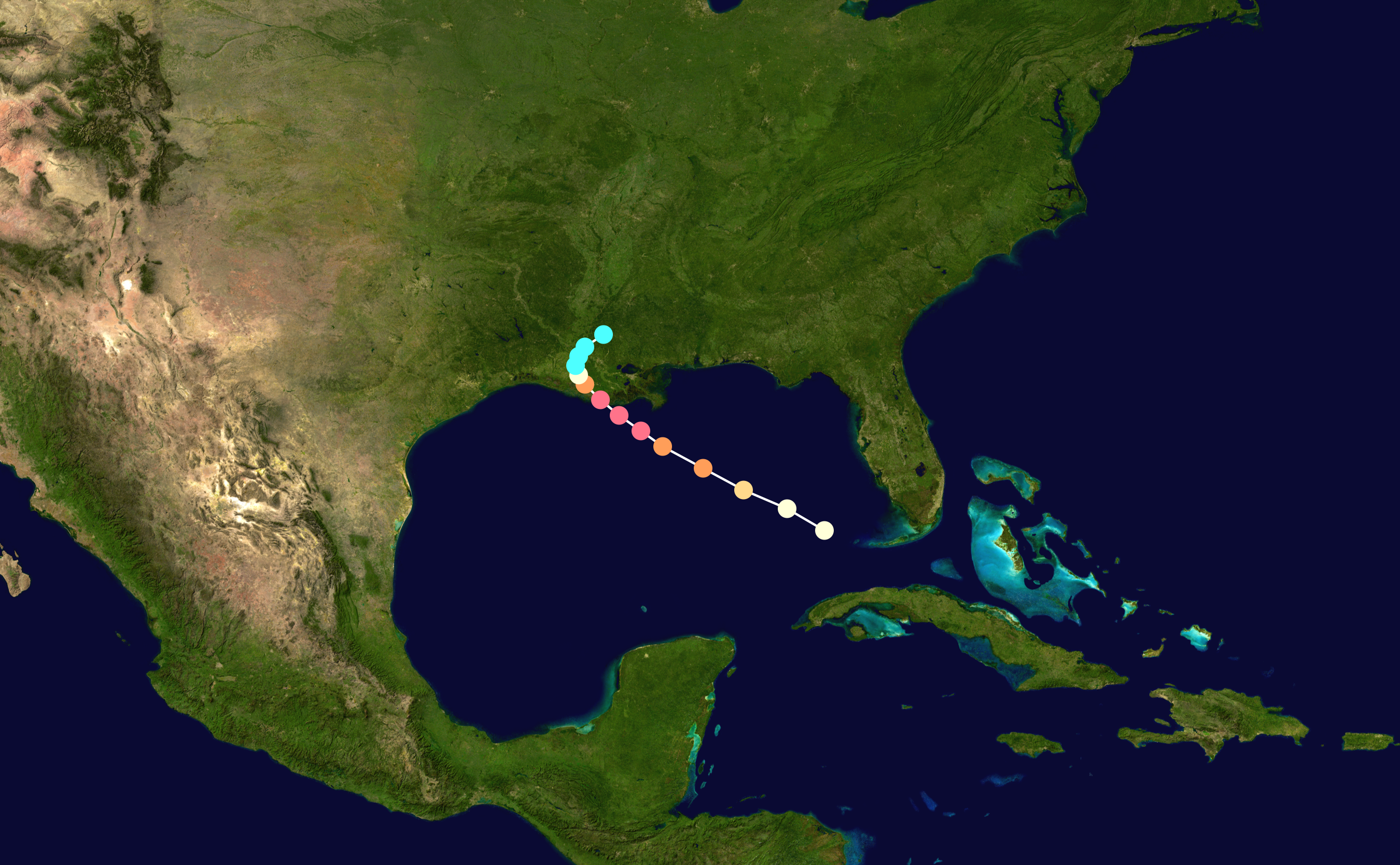
- Duration: August 9 – August 12
- Peak intensity: 150 mph (240 km/h) (1-min); 934 mbar (hPa)

The Last Island Hurricane of 1856

On August 9, a minimal hurricane was observed near the Dry Tortugas. The storm moved northwestward and strengthened, becoming a Category 2 hurricane about 12 hours later. The hurricane reached Category 3 strengthened late on August 9. It continued to deepen and became a Category 4 hurricane on the following day. At 1800 UTC on August 10, the hurricane attained its peak intensity with maximum sustained winds of 150 mph (240 km/h) and a minimum barometric pressure of 934 mbar (27.6 inHg). Simultaneously, the storm made landfall in Last Island, Louisiana. It rapidly weakened inland and fell to tropical storm intensity on August 11. The system then drifted northeastward, until dissipating over Mississippi early on August 12.

Offshore, at least 183 people drowned after steamers and schooners sunk in rough seas produced by the hurricane. A storm surge between 11 and 12 feet (3.4 and 3.7 m) lashed Last Island, Louisiana. The island was completely submerged, with virtually every structure destroyed, including the hotels and casinos, while all crops were ruined. Additionally, Last Island itself split in two. Inland, heavy rainfall caused the Mermentau River to overflow, destroying crops and every house in Abbeville. The storm produced up to 13.14 inches (334 mm) of precipitation to New Orleans. In Plaquemines Parish, rice fields were under several feet of water, while many orange trees lost their fruit. The storm resulted in at least 200 fatalities, making it one of the deadliest tropical cyclones in the history of Louisiana.

=== Hurricane Two ===
- Category 1 hurricane (SSHWS)
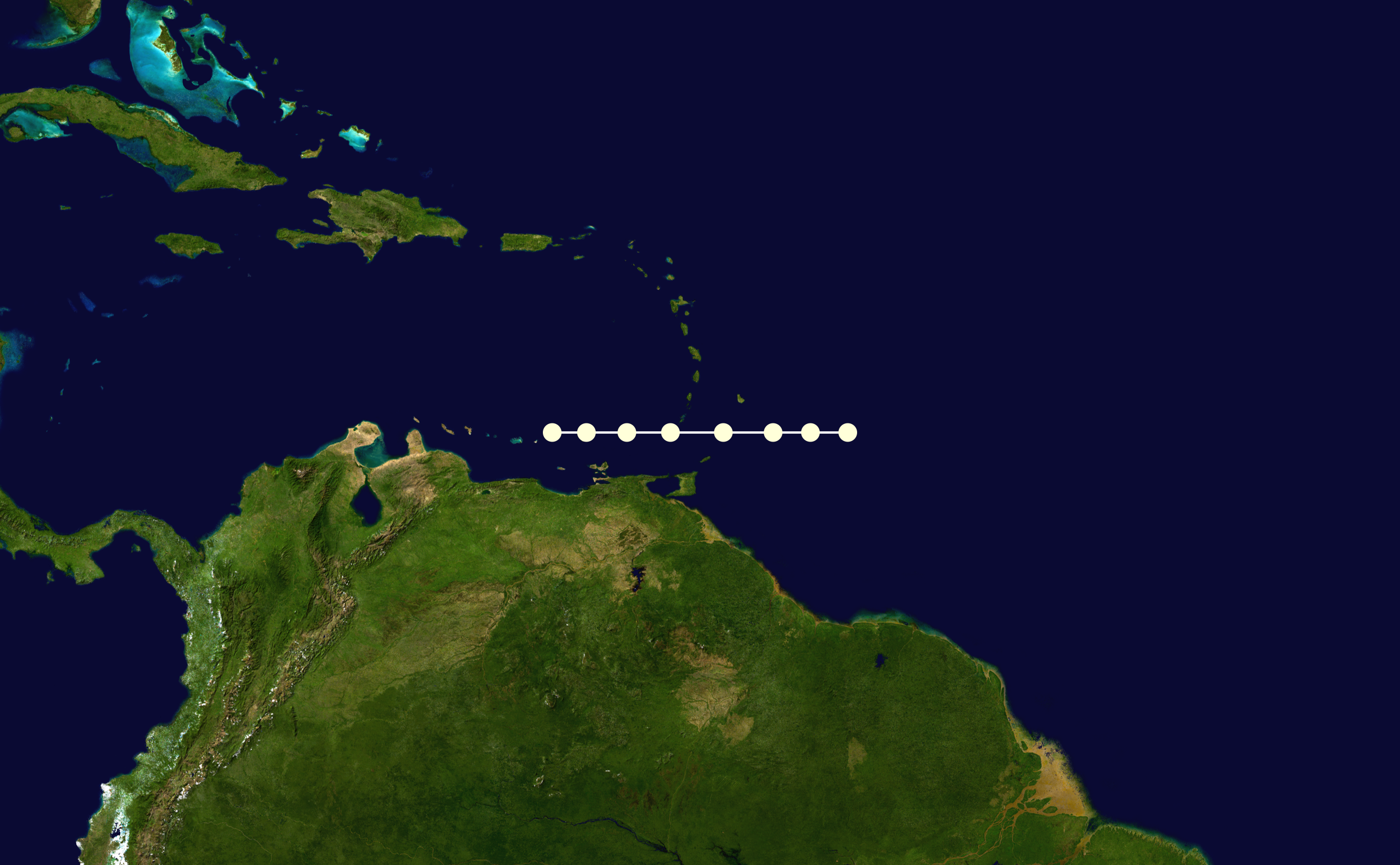
- Duration: August 13 – August 14
- Peak intensity: 80 mph (130 km/h) (1-min);

A hurricane with winds of 80 mph (130 km/h) was initially observed about 750 mi (1,205 km) northwest of the coast of Venezuela on August 13. The cyclone tracked due westward and crossed Grenada, before entering the eastern Caribbean. Heavy rain and squalls were reported in Barbados and Grenada. This system was last noted near La Orchila, Venezuela on August 14.

=== Tropical Storm Three ===
- Tropical storm (SSHWS)
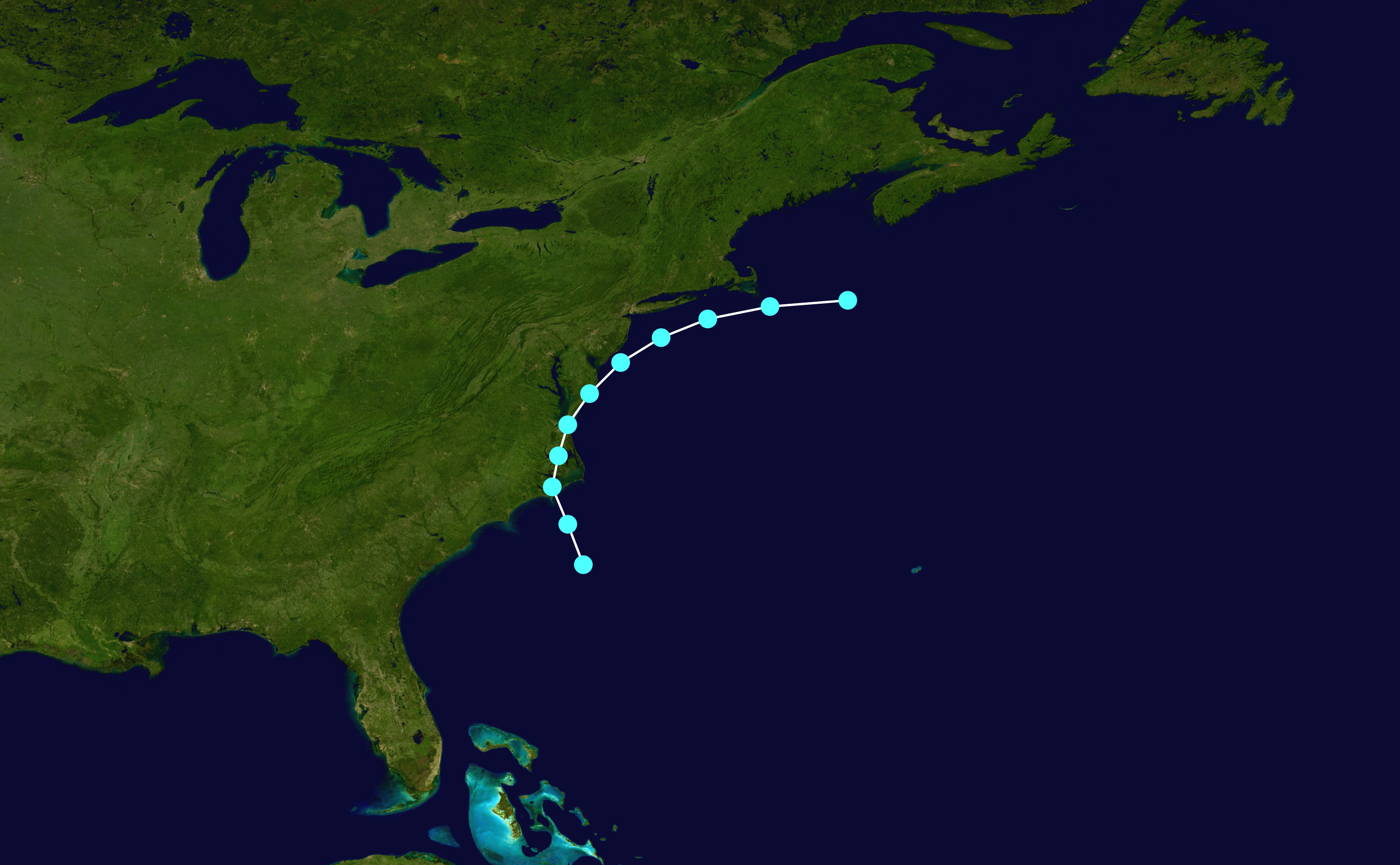
- Duration: August 19 – August 21
- Peak intensity: 60 mph (95 km/h) (1-min);

The third tropical storm of the season developed on August 19 about 170 mi (275 km) southeast of Cape Fear, North Carolina. At 1100 UTC that day, it made landfall near Cape Lookout with winds of 60 mph (95 km/h). The storm traveled north and emerged into the Chesapeake Bay near Norfolk, Virginia. The storm continued travelling northward just offshore of the east coast of the US before finally dissipating off Rhode Island on August 21. Heavy rains and strong winds were reported in Connecticut, Massachusetts, New York, and Washington, D.C. This system was known as the Charter Oak Storm, because it felled the famed Charter Oak in Hartford, Connecticut. Climate researcher Michael Chenoweth proposed the removal of this storm from HURDAT, noting "Weather map analysis indicates low came from Ohio and deepened east of Massachusetts drawing in much colder air behind it".

=== Tropical Storm Four ===
- Tropical storm (SSHWS)
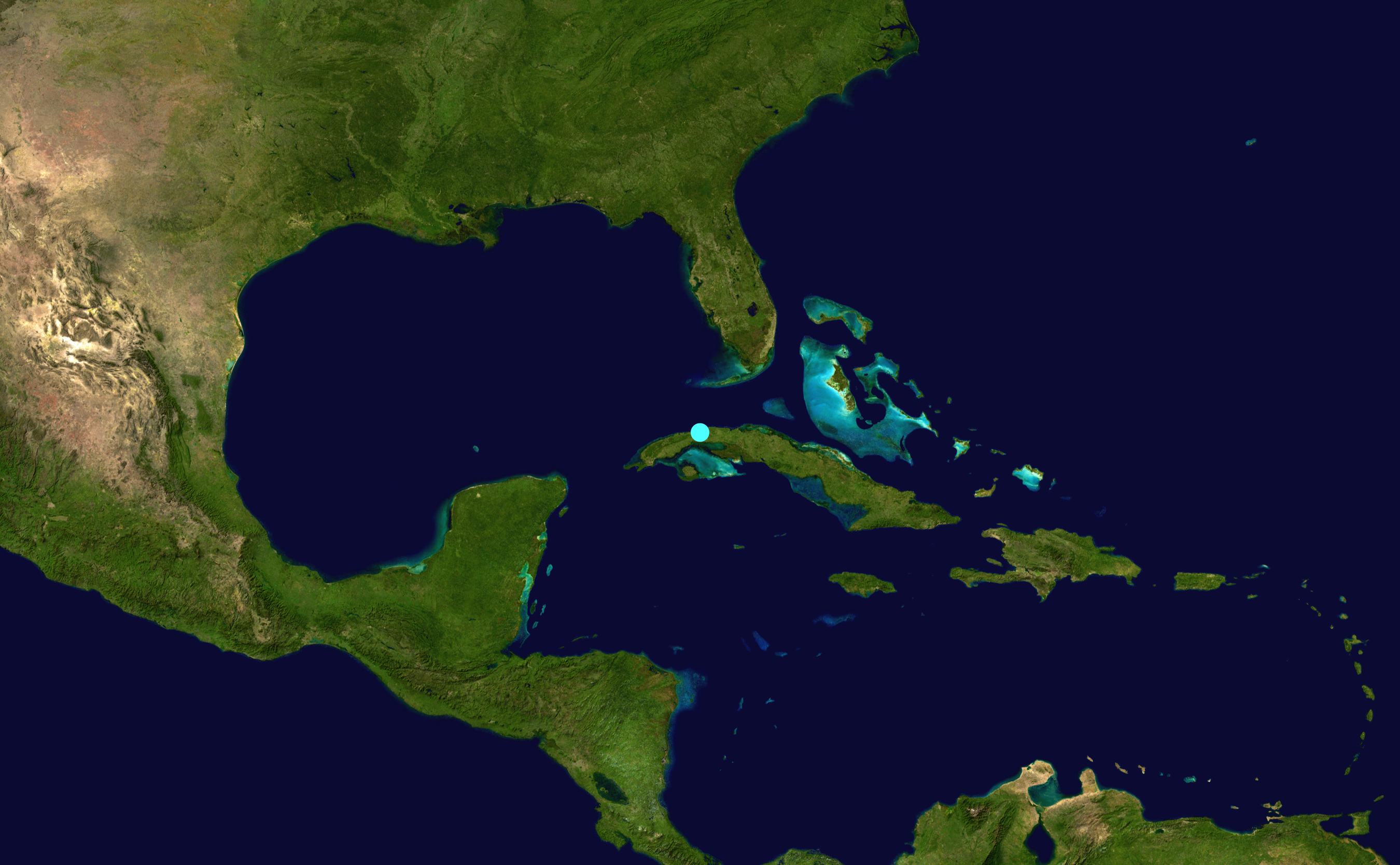
- Duration: August 21 – August 21
- Peak intensity: 60 mph (95 km/h) (1-min);

A limited number of sources indicate that a tropical storm was briefly active in the vicinity of Havana, Cuba on August 21. The storm probably originated from the Bahamas. Chenoweth considers information on this storm to have actually been related to the following cyclone, due to "bad data from Tannehill (1938)".

=== Hurricane Five ===
- Category 3 hurricane (SSHWS)
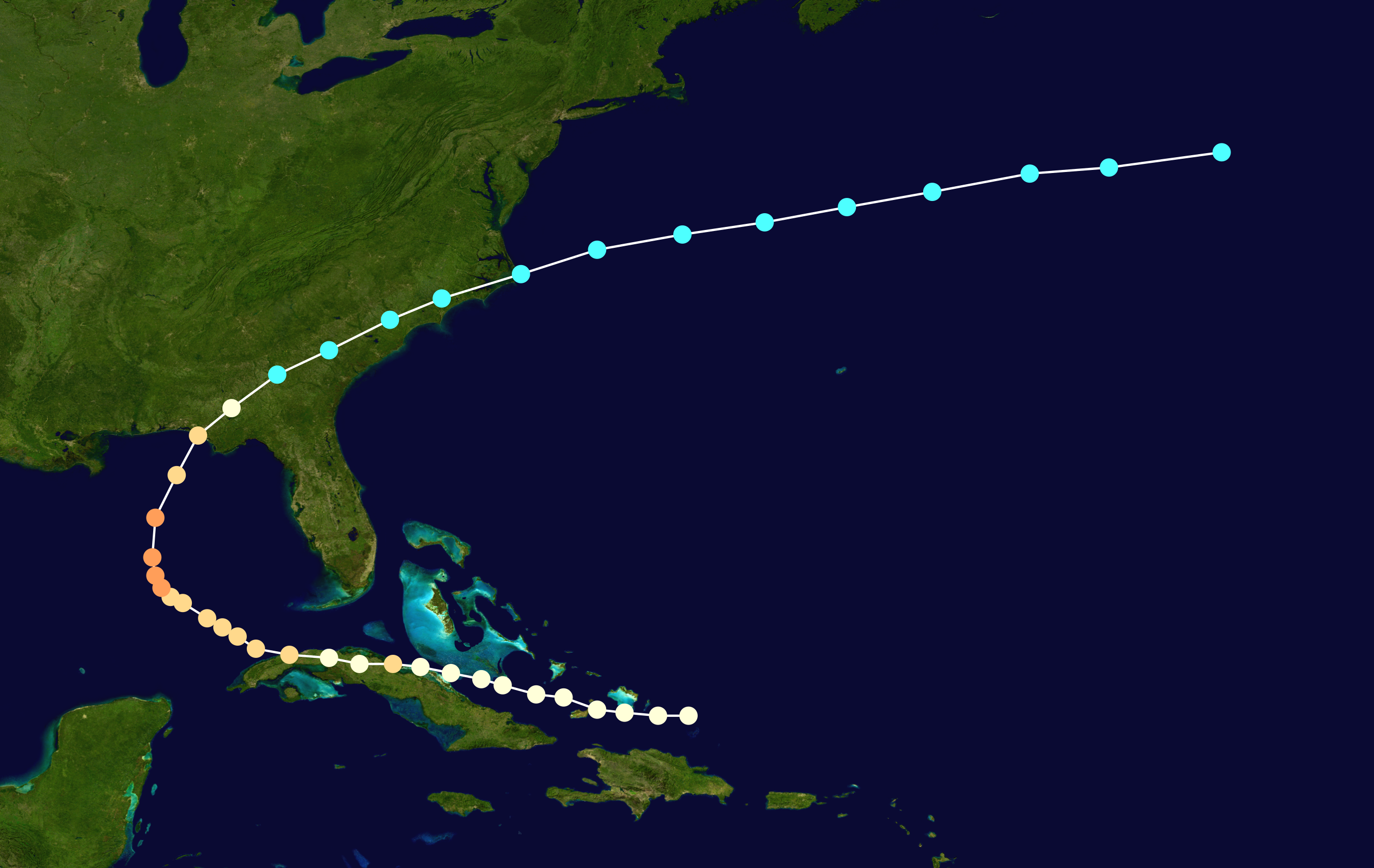
- Duration: August 25 – September 3
- Peak intensity: 115 mph (185 km/h) (1-min); 969 mbar (hPa)

The Southeastern States Hurricane of 1856

A hurricane formed north of Hispaniola on August 25. It moved westward, passing over the Inagua Islands before striking the north coast of Cuba as a Category 2 hurricane on August 27. The cyclone weakened to Category 1 strength as it crossed the island, close to Matanzas, but regained first Category 2 and then Category 3 strength as it moved north through the Gulf of Mexico. The cyclone made landfall near Panama City, Florida, on August 31 as a Category 2 hurricane. Thereafter, it then quickly weakened to a tropical storm while moving northward through Georgia and South Carolina. The storm entered the Atlantic from the state of Virginia on next day and dissipated on September 3.

The hurricane destroyed thirty houses on Inagua and four people died there. Several vessels were run ashore on the Cuban coast. In Florida, high tides were reported along the coast. Tides generated by the storm reportedly washed away all land on Sand Key, although the lighthouse survived. The SS Florida was tossed ashore at St. Joseph Bay and completely destroyed, while streets were inundated with water in Apalachicola. Inland, strong winds and heavy winds brought significant damage, especially at Marianna, which was considered "a wreck." by people in the area. In Georgia, flooding damaged numerous bridges, dams, and corn and cotton crop fields. Many streets and sidewalks in Columbus were blocked by falling trees. At Norfolk, Virginia, on September 1, the spire of a church was blown down by the storm.

=== Hurricane Six ===
- Category 1 hurricane (SSHWS)
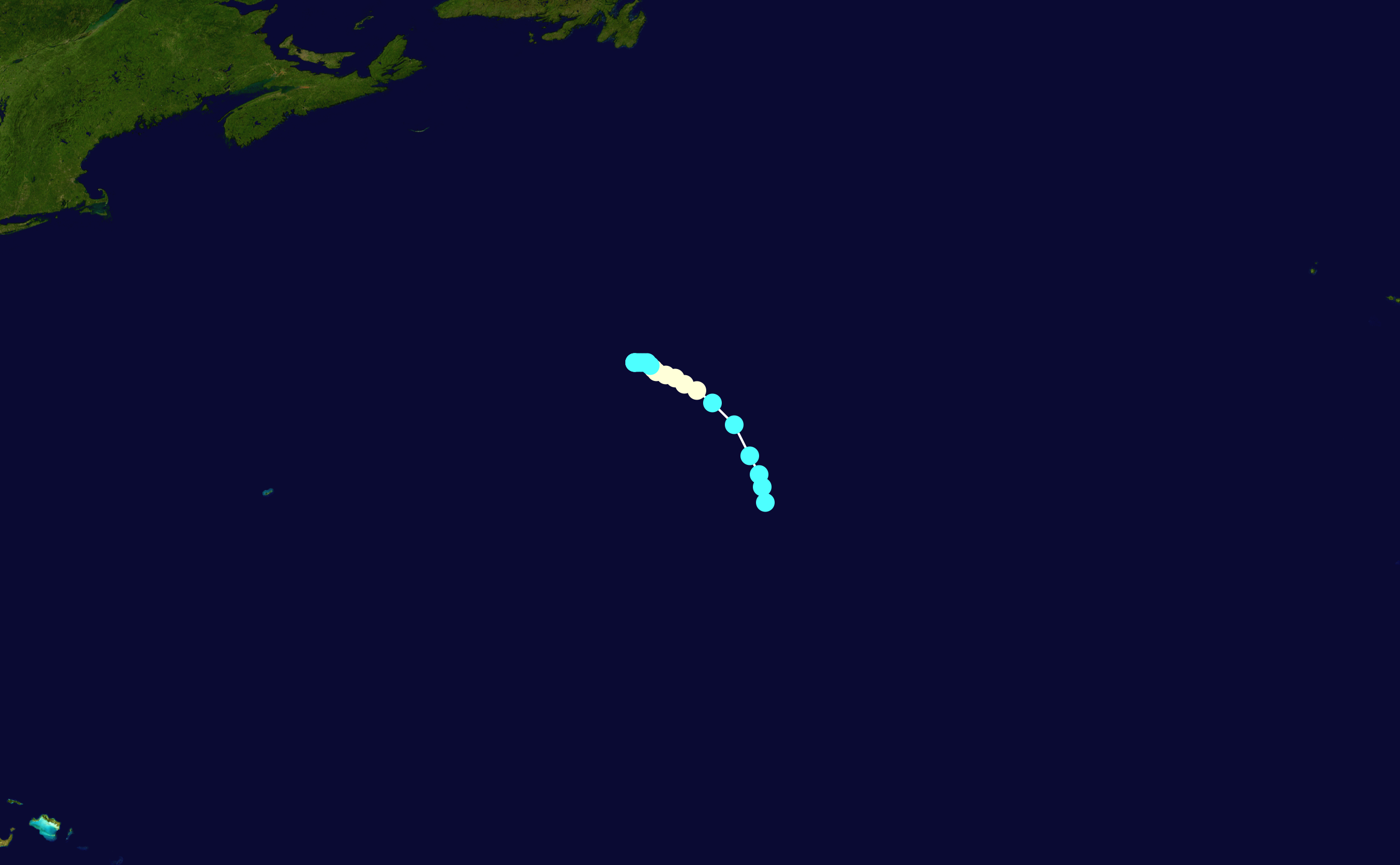
- Duration: September 18 – September 22
- Peak intensity: 80 mph (130 km/h) (1-min);

A sixth tropical storm was first observed by the brig Caroline E. Kelly on September 18, which experienced a heavy gale while located about 930 mi (1,495 km) east-southeast of Bermuda. With initial winds of 60 mph (95 km/h), the storm slowly strengthened while moving north-northwestward. At 1200 UTC on September 19, it reached hurricane status and peaked with winds of 80 mph (130 km/h). The storm decelerated and remained at this intensity for over 24 hours. Late on September 21, the system re-curved westward and weakened to a tropical storm. It was last seen by the Pride of the Sea on September 22, while located about 695 mi (1,120 km) south of Cape Race, Newfoundland.

== Season effects ==
This is a table of all of the known storms that formed in the 1856 Atlantic hurricane season. It includes their duration (within the basin), areas affected, damages, and death totals. Deaths in parentheses are additional and indirect (an example of an indirect death would be a traffic accident), but were still related to that storm. Damage and deaths include totals while the storm was extratropical, a wave, or a low, and all of the damage figures are in 1856 USD.

Saffir–Simpson scale
TD	TS	C1	C2	C3	C4	C5

1856 North Atlantic tropical cyclone season statistics
Storm name	Dates active	Storm category at peak intensity	Max 1-min wind mph (km/h)	Min. press. (mbar)	Areas affected	Damage (US$)	Deaths	Ref(s).
One	August 9–12	Category 4 hurricane	150 (240)	934	Louisiana and southwestern Mississippi	Unknown	400	
Two	August 13–14	Category 1 hurricane	80 (130)	Unknown	Lesser Antilles	Unknown	None	
Three	August 19–21	Tropical storm	60 (95)	Unknown	East Coast of the United States	Unknown	None	
Four	August 21	Tropical storm	60 (95)	Unknown	Cuba	Unknown	None	
Five	August 25 – September 3	Category 3 hurricane	115 (185)	969	Southeastern United States	Unknown	None	
Six	September 18–22	Category 1 hurricane	80 (130)	Unknown	Southeastern United States	Unknown	None	
Season aggregates
6 systems	August 9 – September 22		150 (240)	934		Unknown	≥400	

== See also ==
- Lists of Atlantic hurricanes
- Tropical cyclone forecasting
- HURDAT – A comprehensive record of tropical cyclone tracks since 1851.
- Atlantic reanalysis project – A project to improve historical hurricane data for past storms.
