= 1941 Texas hurricane =

Category 3 Atlantic hurricane in 1941

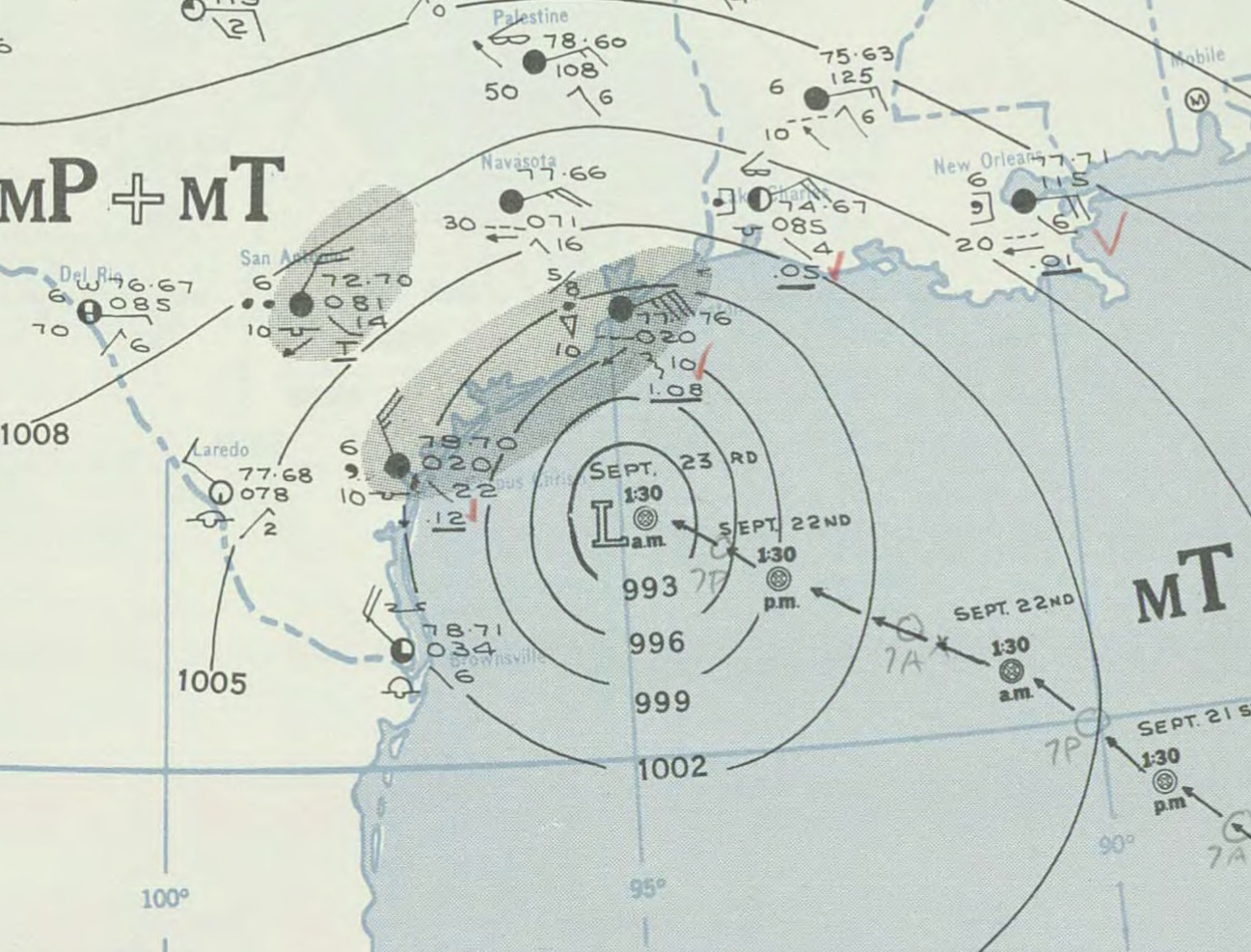
- Surface weather map of the hurricane approaching landfall in Texas at peak intensity on September 23

Meteorological history
- Formed: September 16, 1941
- Extratropical: September 24, 1941
- Dissipated: September 27, 1941

Category 3 major hurricane
- 1-minute sustained (SSHWS/NWS)
- Highest winds: 125 mph (205 km/h)
- Lowest pressure: 942 mbar (hPa); 27.82 inHg

Overall effects
- Fatalities: 7 direct
- Damage: $7.5 million (1941 USD)
- Areas affected: Texas, Midwestern United States, eastern Canada
- IBTrACS
- Part of the 1941 Atlantic hurricane season

The 1941 Texas hurricane, the second storm of the 1941 Atlantic hurricane season, was a large and intense tropical cyclone that struck coastal Texas as a major hurricane in September 1941, causing relatively severe damage. The storm is estimated to have formed in the eastern Gulf of Mexico on September 16. After attaining hurricane strength, it completed a clockwise loop and turned northwestward. The hurricane continued to strengthen until it made landfall near East Matagorda Bay, Texas, with winds of 125 miles per hour (201 km/h), but rapidly weakened as it headed inland. Damage from the storm amounted to about $6.5 million, and crops throughout the region were largely destroyed. The city of Houston suffered extensive damage as the storm passed to the east. The hurricane disrupted activities related to the Louisiana Maneuvers. Later, the system became extratropical and passed over Lake Huron, killing three people in Toronto. Overall, seven people lost their lives due to the cyclone.

== Meteorological history ==
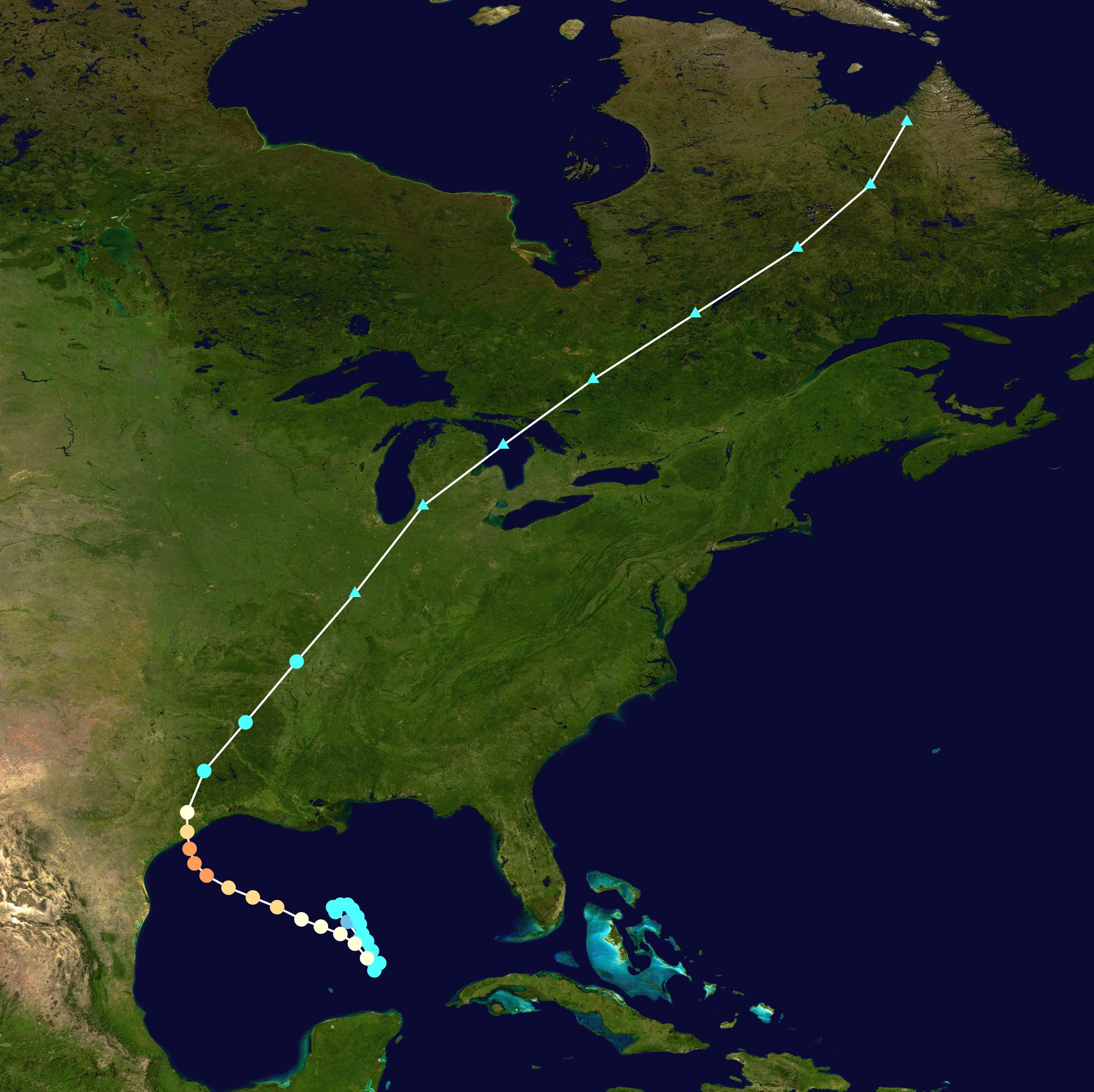
Map plotting the storm's track and intensity, according to the Saffir–Simpson scale Map key Saffir–Simpson scale Tropical depression (≤38 mph, ≤62 km/h) Tropical storm (39–73 mph, 63–118 km/h) Category 1 (74–95 mph, 119–153 km/h) Category 2 (96–110 mph, 154–177 km/h) Category 3 (111–129 mph, 178–208 km/h) Category 4 (130–156 mph, 209–251 km/h) Category 5 (≥157 mph, ≥252 km/h) Unknown Storm type Tropical cyclone Subtropical cyclone Extratropical cyclone, remnant low, tropical disturbance, or monsoon depression

In the middle of September, disturbed atmospheric conditions from a trough or tropical wave existed over the western Caribbean Sea and gradually coalesced near western Cuba on September 15–16. Even so, surrounding surface weather observations did not suggest that an area of low pressure had generated, but gradual organization continued until a tropical depression formed on September 17 in the central Gulf of Mexico about 120 miles (193 km) north of the Yucatán Peninsula. Operationally, the United States Weather Bureau failed to detect a tropical cyclone in the Gulf of Mexico until a day later. After formation, the system initially moved northwestward, a heading that continued early on September 18. At that time, the system became a tropical storm more than 300 mi (483 km) to the south-southeast of New Orleans, Louisiana.

Over the next three days, the intensifying storm executed a gradual clockwise loop, moving to the south-southeast before turning back to the west. After intensifying into a hurricane on September 21, the storm began assuming a more northwestward course, toward the Texas Gulf Coast. It continued to strengthen into a major hurricane, peaking at 125 miles per hour (201 km/h) late on September 23. Just afterward, the storm went ashore east of Bay City, Texas, at peak intensity with an estimated central pressure of 942 millibars (27.82 inHg). However, few weather instruments were sited close to the point of landfall, so the lowest recorded pressure on land was only 970.5 mb (28.66 inHg) in Houston. After landfall, the cyclone curved to the northeast and passed just west of Houston early on September 24. It accelerated as it continued to move inland and transitioned into an extratropical storm on September 25. The post-tropical system dissipated early on September 27 over northeastern Quebec, near the Torngat Mountains National Park.

== Preparations ==
In advance of the storm, advisories and warnings were widely distributed by press, radio, telegraph and telephone. About 25,000 residents evacuated their homes; some small towns along the coast were described as "deserted". People in low-lying areas of coastal Louisiana sought shelter as storm surge from the hurricane affected the northern Gulf Coast. Residents in Texas prepared their homes and businesses for the hurricane, and boat owners pulled their craft out of the water. In Port Arthur, structures were boarded up and hundreds of refugees sought shelter in local hotels. American Red Cross workers were dispatched to the state. In Houston, a temporary hospital was erected. Police and firefighters in the city were put on alert. Vessels near the storm were advised to proceed with caution.

== Impact ==
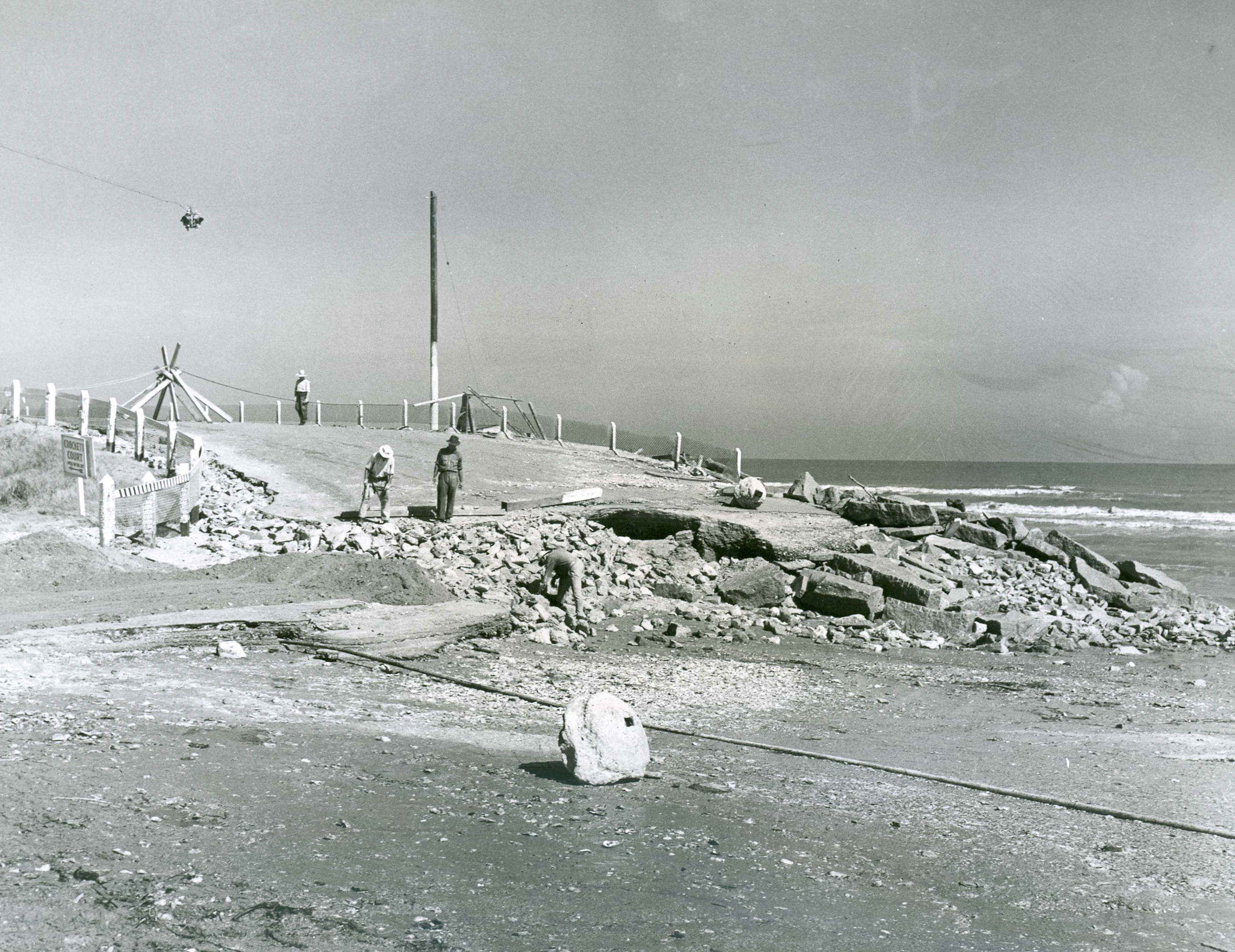
Men from the Works Progress Administration doing emergency repair to the road at the end of the Galveston, Texas Seawall.

Overall damage from the storm totaled approximately $7 million, of which about $4 million can be attributed to the destruction of crops, notably rice and cotton. The hurricane affected the southern Louisiana region one week before the Louisiana Maneuvers, a series of military exercises held during August and September 1941. The exercise was designed to test US troop training, logistics, doctrine, and commanders and is considered a prelude to World War II. The rainfall triggered flooding and swelled rivers, and army vehicles became stuck in the mud as a result. Hundreds of military aircraft were forced to move inland for shelter.

Winds along the coast of Texas reached 100 mph (160 km/h) at numerous points near the hurricane's center. A report from Galveston explained, "There was little characteristic sky appearance prior to the advent of the storm, the sky being mostly clear until lower clouds appeared suddenly between 6 and 7 a. m. C. S. T., on the 22d with altocumulus and alto-stratus overcast showing through breaks occasionally during the day. By late afternoon of the 22d the sky became completely overcast with low clouds of bad weather which predominated throughout the remainder of the storm." Tides at the city, already slightly above-normal due to a previous storm, rose to a crest of 7 ft (2.1 m) on September 23, flooding large portions of Galveston Island. A local airport was flooded with 1 to 3 ft (0.30 to 0.91 m) of tidewater.

As the hurricane moved inland, the city of Houston was hit especially hard. Three people in the area died and several others were injured. Winds blew at up to 77 mph (124 km/h), catching many off-guard after a previous forecast that deemed the region was safe. Some sections of the city were left without power. The winds destroyed poorly built structures and damaged others, and some streets were flooded. An athletic stadium was demolished by the storm, and glass windows were shattered in downtown stores. A preliminary estimate placed the damage in Houston at $500,000. In the aftermath of the storm, fifteen truckloads of shattered glass were removed.

After spreading across the United States, the remnants moved through Ontario and Quebec, producing hurricane-force wind gusts and 40 ft (12 m) waves along Lake Ontario. Throughout the lake, 55 vessels sunk due to the storm, resulting in tens of thousands of dollars in damage. High winds caused power outages and structural damage, as well as destroyed wheat fields across Ontario. In Toronto, the storm killed three people and injured others.

== See also ==
- List of United States hurricanes
- History of Texas
