= Last Island (Louisiana) =

Last Island Isle Dernière
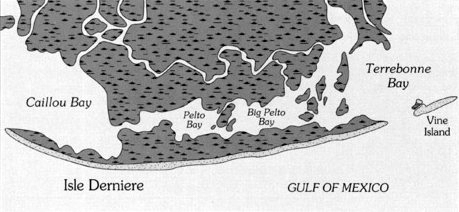
- Last Island in 1853

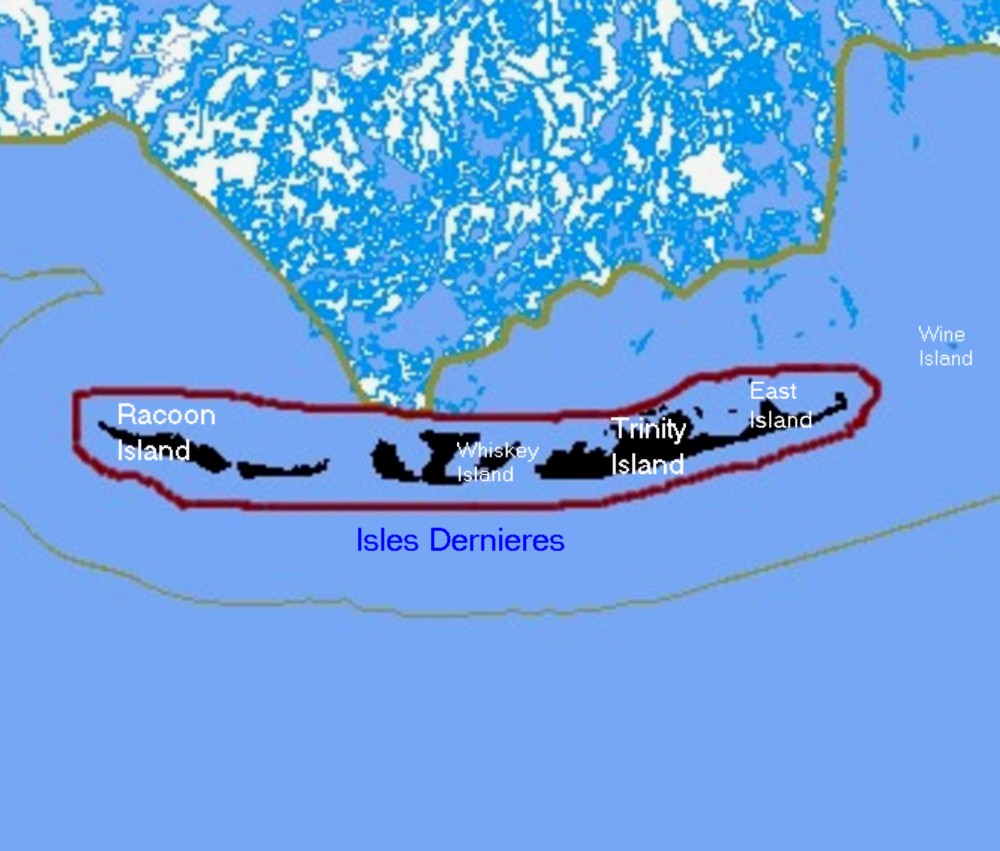
- Remaining portions of Last Island

- Location of Last Island in Louisiana
- Coordinates: 29°02′19″N 90°48′15″W
- Country: United States
- State: Louisiana
- Parish: Terrebonne

Area
  - Total: 42 sq mi (110 km^{2})
  - Land: 3.625 sq mi (9.39 km^{2})
  - Water: 38.375 sq mi (99.39 km^{2})
- Elevation: 5 ft (1.5 m)
- Time zone: UTC-6 (CST)
  - Summer (DST): UTC-5 (CDT)

Last Island (Official name: Isle Dernière, often misspelled as Îsle Dernière, Isle Dernier, L'Îsle Dernière, Île Dernière, etc.) was a barrier island and location of a pleasure resort southwest of New Orleans on the Gulf Coast of Louisiana, United States. Located south of Dulac, Louisiana, between Lake Pelto, Caillou Bay, and the Gulf of Mexico, it was named Last Island because it was the last of a series of barrier islands which stretched westward from the mouth of the Mississippi River, 90 miles to the east.

The island was destroyed by the Last Island Hurricane of August 10, 1856, which split it in two. Afterwards, it became known in the plural Isles Dernières ("Last Islands").

The island was originally approximately 25 miles in length before being split in half by the storm. Subsequent tropical storms did more damage, and Isle Dernière was further fragmented into the smaller islands of Wine, Trinity/East, Whiskey, and Raccoon. The collective islands are now known as the Isles Dernieres Barrier Island Refuge, since 1992. There have been a number of different projects aimed at rebuilding and protecting the islands, including in 1998, when sand was suctioned up to raise the level of the islands, and plantings were made to keep the new land in place.

The closest village to the islands is Cocodrie, about 15 miles to the northeast.

== Lighthouse ==
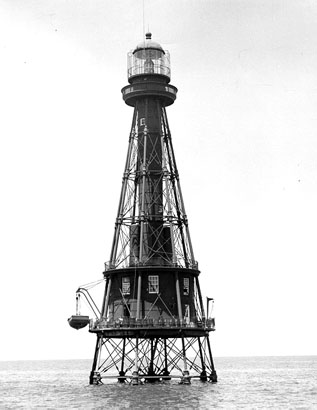
Ship Shoal Lighthouse

The Louisiana legislature petitioned the U.S. Congress in 1848 for a lighthouse for the island, and money was appropriated for a lightship, which would be placed on Ship Shoal, several miles southeast of the island. The revenue cutter McLane was converted at the cost of $12,774.67 (equivalent to $370,000 in 2024) into the lightship Pleasonton – named after Stephen Pleasonton, the auditor of the Treasury, who oversaw federal lighthouses in the United States. It was put into service on December 29, 1849, but was replaced in 1860 by a permanent lighthouse of the iron skeletal tower type. The Ship Shoal Lighthouse was discontinued and abandoned in 1965.

== Resort at Last Island ==
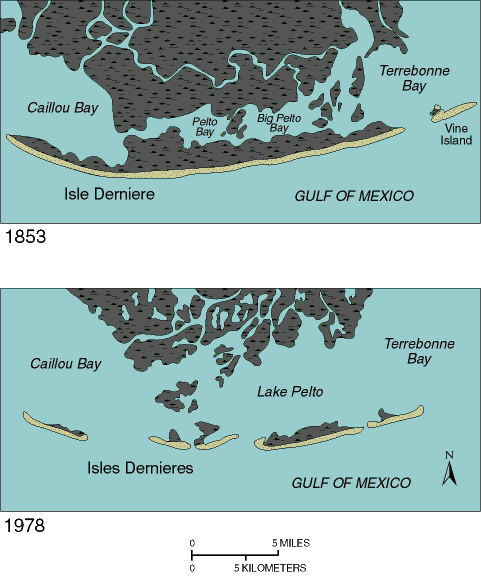
Graphic showing the loss of Last Island, broken into separate islands over time

Before the Last Island Hurricane, the island was a popular resort where people could enjoy white sand beaches and clearer water, which are not found on the marshy mainland. Last Island was also known for an almost continuous breeze, which would have been welcomed by those escaping the suffocating heat of New Orleans. Accommodations included the John Muggah's Ocean House Hotel, and for entertainment there were several gambling establishments and the Captain Dave Muggah's Billiard House. Several hundred yards to the west of the hotel was the settlement known as Last Island Village which consisted of approximately 100 beach homes, some "fine" houses and other temporary summer houses.

Regular steamer service to the island was provided by the Star from Bayou Boeuf. The New Orleans, Opelousas and Great Western Railroad provided a connection to Bayou Boeuf from Algiers, La., a short ride on the Algiers Train Ferry across the Mississippi River from the French Quarter landing at St. Ann Street. Regular railroad fare was $3.50 with half-fare for children and servants. New Orleanians could take the Algiers passenger ferry.

Of the approximately 400 vacationers on the island at the time the hurricane hit it, 198 were known or presumed dead and 203 were known survivors. Several of the victims were enslaved people, some of whom were credited with rescuing others, including several children. Every structure on the island including the hotel, a large, two-story wooden structure of considerable strength, was destroyed, and the island was left void of crops and other vegetation.

== Litigation ==
A Spanish claim to the island was brought by descendants of Juan Voisin against hospitality investors which occurred after the inhabitable portion of the island was developed in 1848.

== Isles Dernieres Barrier Island Refuge ==
The Isles Dernieres Barrier Islands Refuge encompasses four islands: from east to west, Wine, Trinity/East, Whiskey, and Raccoon, as well as several thousand acres of associated water. There is a public use area for bird-watching, picnicking, fishing, and overnight camping on Trinity Island; any other use of the islands requires a permit from the Louisiana Department of Wildlife and Fisheries, which owns the islands and has managed them since June 1992, when they were initially leased from the Louisiana Land and Exploration Company. The islands currently protect the mainland to the north from erosion and damage from hurricanes, but their primary purpose is to provide protected habitat for nesting waterbirds, such as pelicans. Raccoon Island in particular is one of the most important waterbird nesting areas on the Louisiana Gulf Coast.

=== Restoration projects ===
The federal government committed to restoring barrier island natural storm buffers in 1990, with passage of the Coastal Wetlands Planning, Protection and Restoration Act (CWPPRA). Since 2005, the urgent need to stop erosion, repair damage to barrier islands, as well as restore critical habitat loss, has been a priority for the state of Louisiana. Over 7,000 acres (2,800 ha) of barrier island and headland habitats have been restored as well as over 70 miles (110 km) of barrier islands and berms across the state. The $118 million Caillou Lake Headlands Restoration Project, AKA Whiskey Island, and designated TE-100, began in 2015 and was completed in 2018.

The Terrebonne Barrier Island Project, also referred to as the Terrebonne Basin Barrier Shoreline Restoration (TBBSR), or Terrebonne Basin Barrier Island and Beach Nourishment Project, is a broad island restoration project, that has been ongoing since 2019. This included a $166 million project (2019-2022) transferring sand to raise up the islands and tree planting to protect and stabilize them. A total of 8.8 million cubic yards of dredged sediment was used.

Since 2022, 1,080 acres (440 ha) have been restored, 252 acres (102 ha) on Timbalier Island, and 567 acres (229 ha) on West Belle Headland (West Belle Pass Barrier Headland). The work has been funded largely by the Louisiana Coastal Protection and Restoration Authority (CPRA), since the aftermath of Hurricanes Katrina and Rita, overseen by the Louisiana Department of Fish and Wildlife, and administered by the National Fish and Wildlife Foundation (NFWF), also including the Bureau of Ocean Energy Management (BOEM), as well as federal, state, and local partners. A large amount of the funding provided came from the Deepwater Horizon oil spill. Isles Dernieres Barrier Island Refuge restoration has provided nesting habitat for Brown Pelicans, as well as Royal Terns, Sandwich Terns, Black Skimmers, wading birds such as the Great egrets and Black-crowned night herons. Other wildlife includes the federally protected Piping plover, Reddish Egret, and the Rufa Red knot. The islands are also home to Loggerhead, Leatherback, and Kemp's Ridley sea turtles.
