= HURDAT =

Databases with info about Atlantic and East Pacific hurricanes

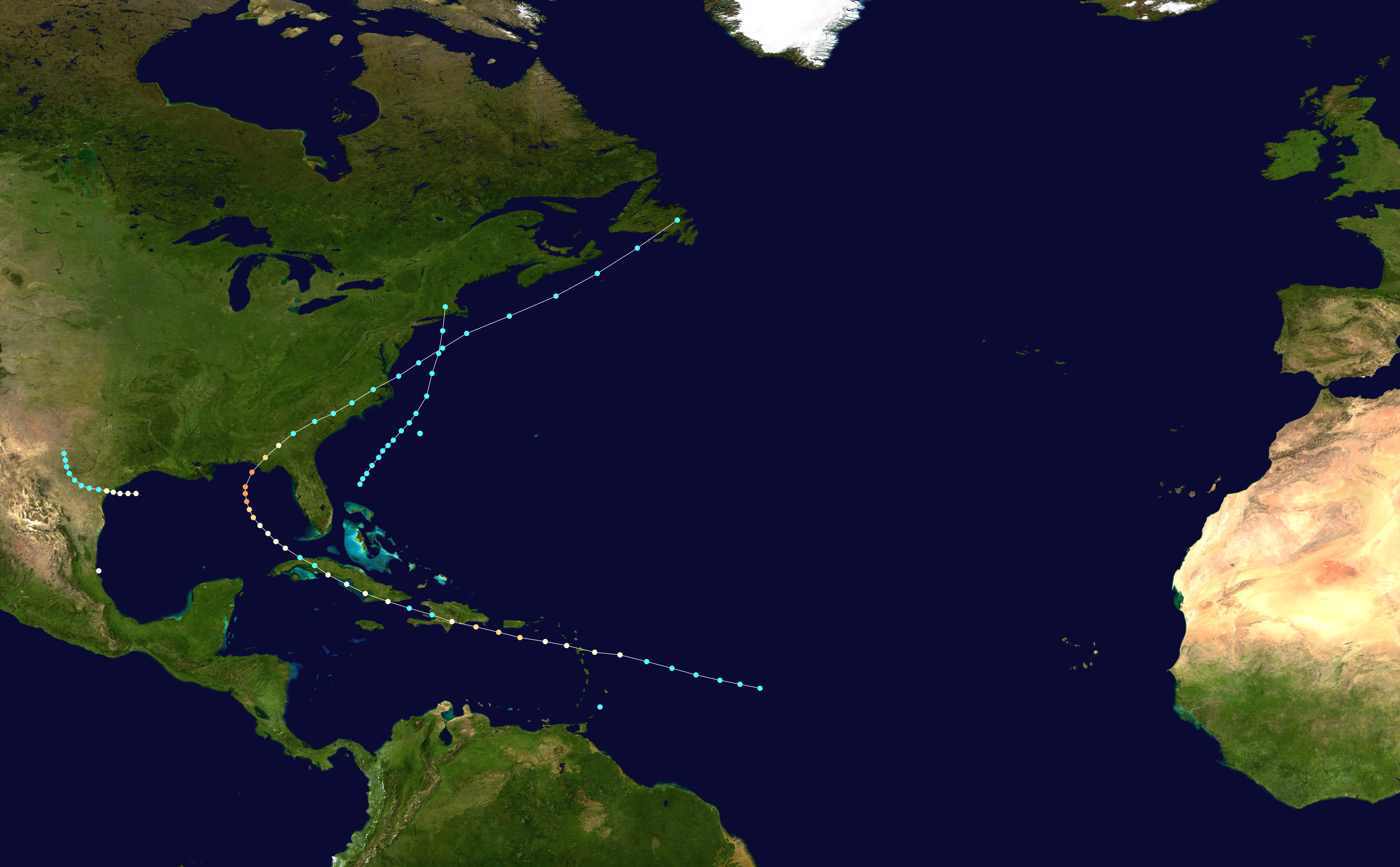
Image of the 1851 Atlantic hurricane season summary generated from HURDAT data.

The Hurricane Databases (HURDAT), managed by the National Hurricane Center (NHC), are two separate databases that contain details on tropical cyclones that have occurred in the Atlantic Ocean and Eastern Pacific Ocean since 1851 and 1949, respectively.

The Eastern Pacific database was compiled at the NHC in 1976 to help create two tropical cyclone forecast models. Initially, tracks for the Central Pacific region and tracks for tropical depressions that did not develop into tropical storms or hurricanes were not included. Over the next few years, tracks from the Eastern Pacific Hurricane Center (EPHC) were archived by the NHC annually. In 1982, the NHC started to include data on Central Pacific tropical storms and hurricanes, and began issuing advisories in 1988. In 2013, the format of the Eastern Pacific database was changed to include non-synoptic best track times and non-developing tropical depressions.

== The Atlantic hurricane database ==
During 1959, a technical paper was published by the United States Weather Bureau, which consolidated several sources of records in to a single publication. These sources included annual summaries that had been published in the Monthly Weather Review at various times since 1922, unpublished materials from the Hurricane forecast offices and other studies on hurricanes and hurricane climatology back to around 1886. While combining the sources, position errors of over 100 miles (160 km) were found for several hurricanes shown in more than one source. Therefore, the positions of all of the systems that were considered to have tropical characteristics, were compared with the historical weather maps of the daily synoptic series. The most reliable positions and intensities were then plotted on a series of annual track charts, before being reviewed by the hurricane forecast centers, Extended Forecast Section and the National Hurricane Research Project. The most accurate and consistent locations from the reviews were then plotted on the maps and published. This dataset was subsequently updated during 1965, which extended the dataset back to 1871 and forwards to 1963 based on additional material.

At around this time, NASA's Apollo program requested data on the climatological impacts of tropical cyclones on launches of space vehicles at the Kennedy Space Center. The basic data was taken by the authors from the National Weather Records North Atlantic Tropical Cyclone deck number 988, which was updated and corrected to include data from 1886 to 1968. As a result of this work, a requirement for a computerized tropical cyclone database at the National Hurricane Center was realized, which led to the prediction of tropical cyclone motion out through 72 hours. Over the next few years, HURDAT was extensively revised, by both the NHC and the National Climatic Center, before it was published at irregular intervals. Over the next couple of decades, it became obvious that the database needed to be revised because it was incomplete, contained significant errors, or did not reflect the latest scientific understanding regarding the interpretation of past data. Charles J Neumann subsequently documented several of these problems and obtained a grant, to start addressing them in a programme that was eventually called the Atlantic Hurricane Database Re-analysis Project.

During the 1990s, Jose Fernandez-Partagas led efforts to document previously undocumented tropical cyclones from the mid 1800s until the early 1900s, by using lists of previous hurricanes, books and newspapers. After his death in 1997, the results of his efforts were built upon by the Atlantic reanalysis team, before being checked by NHC's Best Track Committee and added in to the Atlantic HURDAT in 2001 and 2003.

In 2013, the archive's format was significantly changed to include non-synoptic best track times, non-developing tropical depressions and wind radii.

== The Eastern and Central Pacific hurricane database ==
The Eastern Pacific best track database was initially compiled on magnetic tape in 1976 for the seasons between 1949 and 1975, at the NHC to help with the development of two tropical cyclone forecast models, which required tracks of past cyclones as a base for its predictions. The database was based on records held by the United States Navy and were interpolated from 12 hourly intervals to 6 hourly intervals based on a scheme devised by Hiroshi Akima in 1970. Initially tracks for the Central Pacific region and tracks for tropical depressions that did not develop into tropical storms or hurricanes were not included within the database. After the database had been created Arthur Pike of the NHC made some internal adjustments, while in 1980 a review was made by Arnold Court under contract from the United States National Weather Service and resulted in additions and/or modifications to 81 tracks in the database. Between 1976 and 1987, the NHC archived best track data from the Eastern Pacific Hurricane Center, and in 1982 started including information on Central Pacific tropical storms and hurricanes started to be included in the database based on data from the Joint Typhoon Warning Center and research done by Samuel Shaw of the Central Pacific Hurricane Center in 1981. The format of the database was completely revised by the NHC in 1984, so that the format could resemble the Atlantic database before they took over the warning responsibility from the EPHC for the Eastern Pacific in 1988.

In 2008 and in 2013, several revisions were made to the database to extend tracks over land, based on reports in the Mariners Weather Log and extrapolation of the tracks since the EPHC stopped issuing advisories on systems before they made landfall. The archive's format was significantly changed in 2013 to include non-synoptic best track times, non-developing tropical depressions and wind radii. In February 2016, the NHC released the 1959 Mexico hurricane's reanalysis, which was the first system to be reassessed using methods developed for the Atlantic reanalysis process.

== Reanalysis projects ==
After the HURDAT databases were created, it became obvious over the next couple of decades that HURDAT needed to be revised because it was incomplete, contained significant errors, or did not reflect the latest scientific understanding regarding the interpretation of past data.

In 2013, the archive's format was significantly changed to include non-synoptic best track times, non-developing tropical depressions and wind radii. During March 2014, the Atlantic HURDAT was updated with the results of the reanalysis for the seasons between 1946 and 1950, with nine tropical storms added to the database. Hurricane Camille's reanalysis was expedited and published during April 2014, after the National Hurricane Center management realized a need to answer the question: "Which is the strongest hurricane to have struck the United States?" During 2015 and 2016, HURDAT was revised with the results of the reanalysis for the seasons between 1951 and 1955, with 12 new tropical storms added to the database.
