= Elinor DeWire =

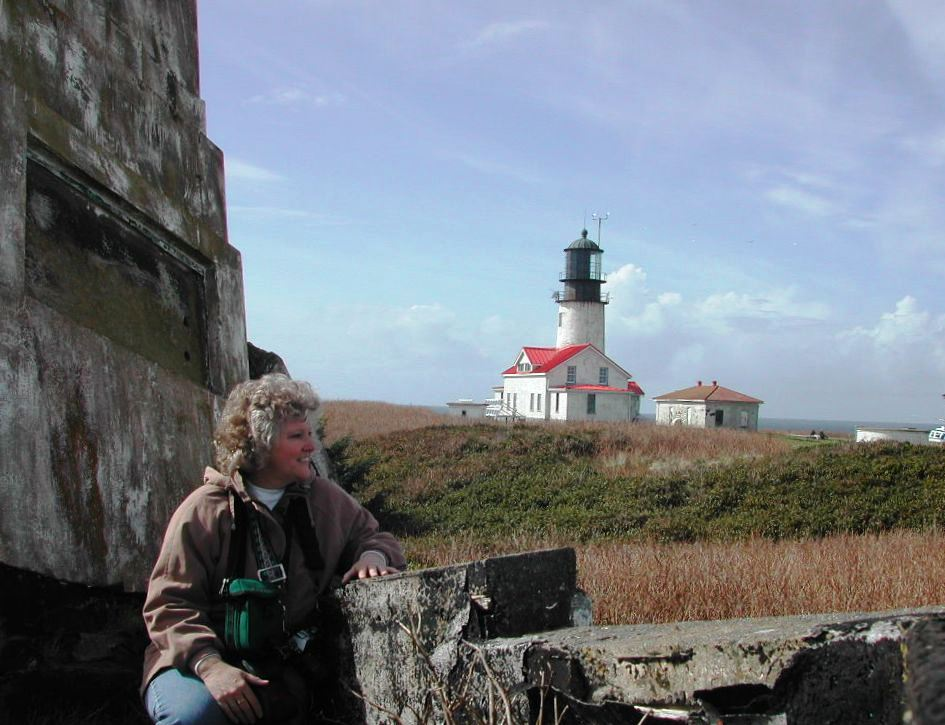

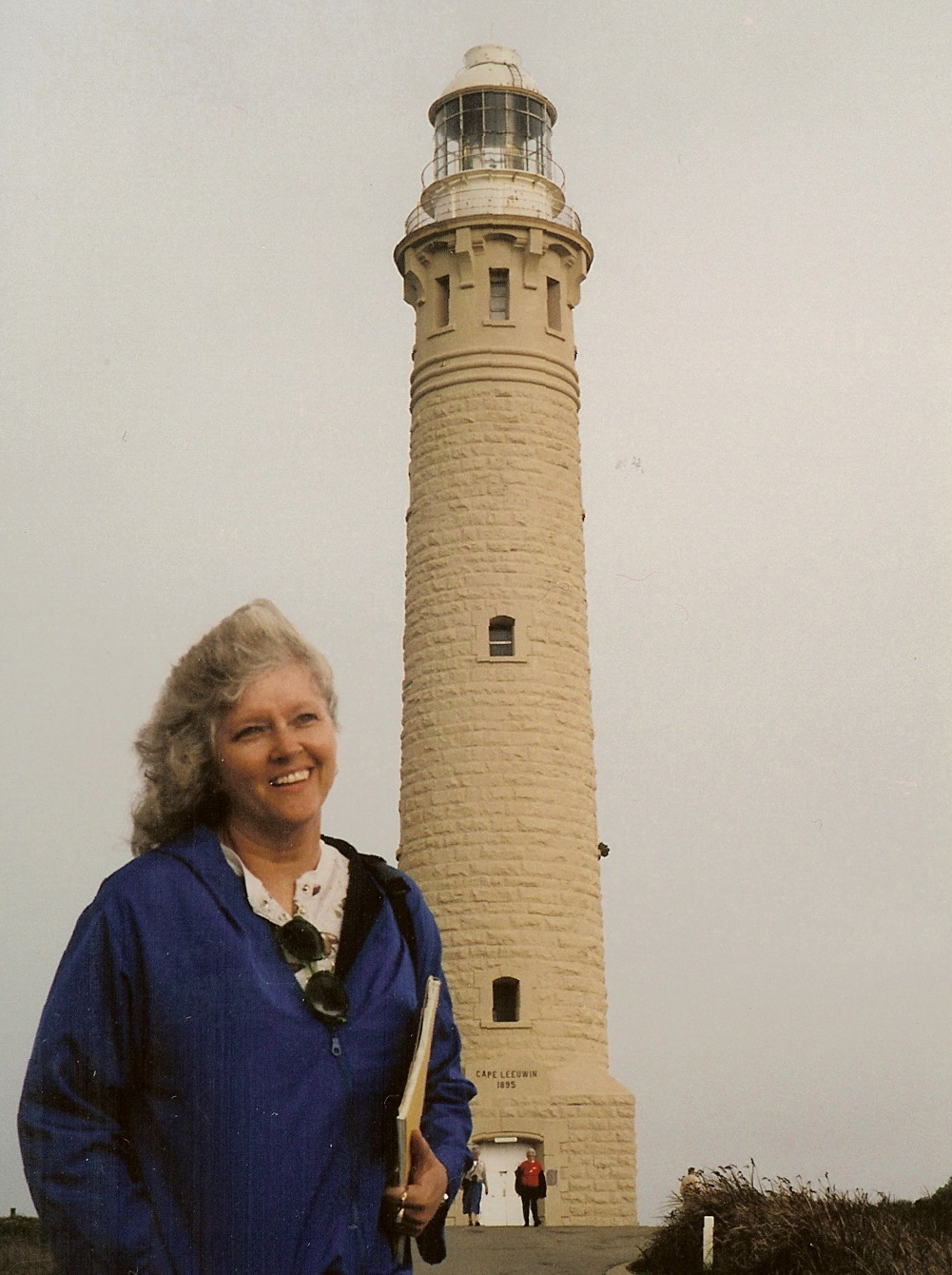
Elinor DeWire at Cape Leuuwin Lighthouse, Australia, August 2000

Elinor DeWire (born August 3, 1953 in Frederick, Maryland) is an American author, freelance writer, editor, public speaker, educator, and blogger based in Connecticut. DeWire writes both fiction and nonfiction, but is best known for her books about lighthouses and her work in lighthouse preservation and education. She occasionally writes under the pseudonyms J.J. Scott, Jessica Scott, and Aline Matthews.

== Early life and education ==
DeWire was born in Frederick, Maryland. She holds an MA in Education from the University of Connecticut. Today, she researches and writes from Connecticut.

== Career ==
DeWire began her career as an author by writing freelance stories for a Florida newspaper. After selling a story about lighthouses to Mobil's Compass Magazine, she wrote her first book, The Guide to Florida Lighthouses, which was published by Pineapple Press in 1987 and remains in print in its third edition.

From 1991-2000 DeWire wrote two columns, "Lifelines" about the U.S. Lifesaving Service, and "Whale Oil and Wicks" about lighthouses, for the National Oceanic & Atmospheric Administration's Mariners Weather Log.

Since that time DeWire has authored some twenty books about lighthouses, including a series of illustrated, quick-reference e-books about lighthouses, the "Itty-Bitty-Kitty Guides". She has also written early Victorian-era novels, plus four books and a number of articles about amateur astronomy and sky watching and an e-book about poultry.

She continues to contribute articles about lighthouses to magazines and newspapers, including columns titled "Shore Almanac," "Away from the Bay," "Kids on the Beam," and "Liquidized Lore." She has been a regular contributor to Weatherwise Magazine, The Beachcomber, Lighthouse Digest", and The Keepers Log, journal of the U.S. Lighthouse Society. She maintains a blog that focuses on lighthouses and related nautical topics, and has written fiction for several magazines.

DeWire is a public speaker about lighthouse history, lore, and preservation. She volunteers for several nonprofit groups devoted to lighthouse preservation and education. She is a member of the Board of Directors of the U.S. Lighthouse Society and chairs the society's Education Committee.

== Awards ==
DeWire's books Lighthouses of the Mid-Atlantic Coast and Lighthouses of the South have won the Ben Franklin Book Award and the Coast Guard Book Award. She was awarded a short fiction prize in 1992 from the National League of American Pen Women. She is also the recipient of the Coast Guard Meritorious Public Service Award and the sponsor of the U.S. Coast Guard fast endurance cutter, FREDERICK HAtCH, named in honor of an 1850s lighthouse keeper. She also received the Ross Holland Award in 2025 for her work in education and preservation of lighthouses.

=== Books by Elinor DeWire ===
- The Guide to Florida Lighthouses, Pineapple Press, 1987 ISBN 1-56164-216-9
- Journey through the Universe, Mystic Seaport Planetarium, 1989
- Activities for Young Astronomers, Mystic Seaport Planetarium, 1990
- Reach for the Sky, Mystic Seaport Planetarium, 1994
- Guardians of the Lights: Stories of U.S. Lighthouse Keepers, Pineapple Press, 1995 & 2001 ISBN 978-1561641192
- The Lighthouse Activity Book, Sentinel Pubs., 1995; E-Z Nature Books, 2007, Paradise Cay Pubs., 2021 ISBN 0-945092-53-9
- Lighthouse Victuals & Verse, Sentinel Publications, 1996 (out of print)
- Sentries along the Shore, Sentinel Publications, 1997 (out of print) ISBN 0-9657313-1-6
- The Lighthouse Almanac, Sentinel Publications, 2000 (out of print) ISBN 0-9657313-2-4
- The Florida Night Sky, Pineapple Press, 2002 ISBN 1-56164-238-X f
- Lighthouses of the Mid-Atlantic Coast, Voyageur Press, 2002, 2011 ISBN 978-0-7603-3951-0
- Lighthouses: Sentinels of the American Coast, Graphic Arts Center Publishing, 2003 ISBN 1-55868-698-3
- Lighthouses of the South, Voyageur Press, 2004 (out of print) ISBN 0-89658-603-0
- Florida Lighthouses for Kids, Pineapple Press, 2004 ISBN 1-56164-323-8
- Field Guide to Lighthouses of the Pacific Coast, Voyageur Press, 2006 ISBN 978-0-7603-2466-0
- The Lightkeepers' Menagerie: Stories of Animals at Lighthouses, Pineapple Press, 2007 ISBN 978-1-56164-390-5
- Field Guide to Lighthouses of the New England Coast, Voyageur Press, 2008 (out of print) ISBN 978-0-7603-2750-0
- Lighthouses of Greece, Pineapple Press, 2010 ISBN 978-1-56164-460-5
- The DeWire Guide to the Lighthouses of the Pacific Coast:California, Oregon and Washington, Paradise Cay Publications, 2010 ISBN 978-0939837-86-1
- The DeWire Guide to the Lighthouses of Alaska, Hawai'i and U.S. Pacific Territories, 2012 ISBN 978-1-937196-91-2
- The Funky Chicken: Memories, Truth and Tribute, Cat in the Window Press, 2013 ASIN: BOOFAS4U6W
- "Sojourn to the Lighthouse," Cat in the Window Press, 2015. ASIN: B00USJ49VY
- Itty-Bitty-Kitty Guide to the Lighthouses of Georgia, Cat in the Window Press, 2014 ASIN: BOOIVTC118
- Itty-Bitty-Kitty Guide to the Lighthouses of New Hampshire, 2014 ASIN: BOOKQ4V3RE
- Lighthouses Here & There, Cat in the Window Press, 2017 ISBN 9781537040820
- Saving Lord M, Cat in the Window Press ISBN 9781720519287
- Dr. Bellamy's Broken Wife, Cat in the Window Press ISBN 9798606779284
- The Lord of Draig Nyth, Cat in the Window Press ISBN 9798595424745
- "Under the Acacia Trees," Cat in the window Press ISBN 9798397886338

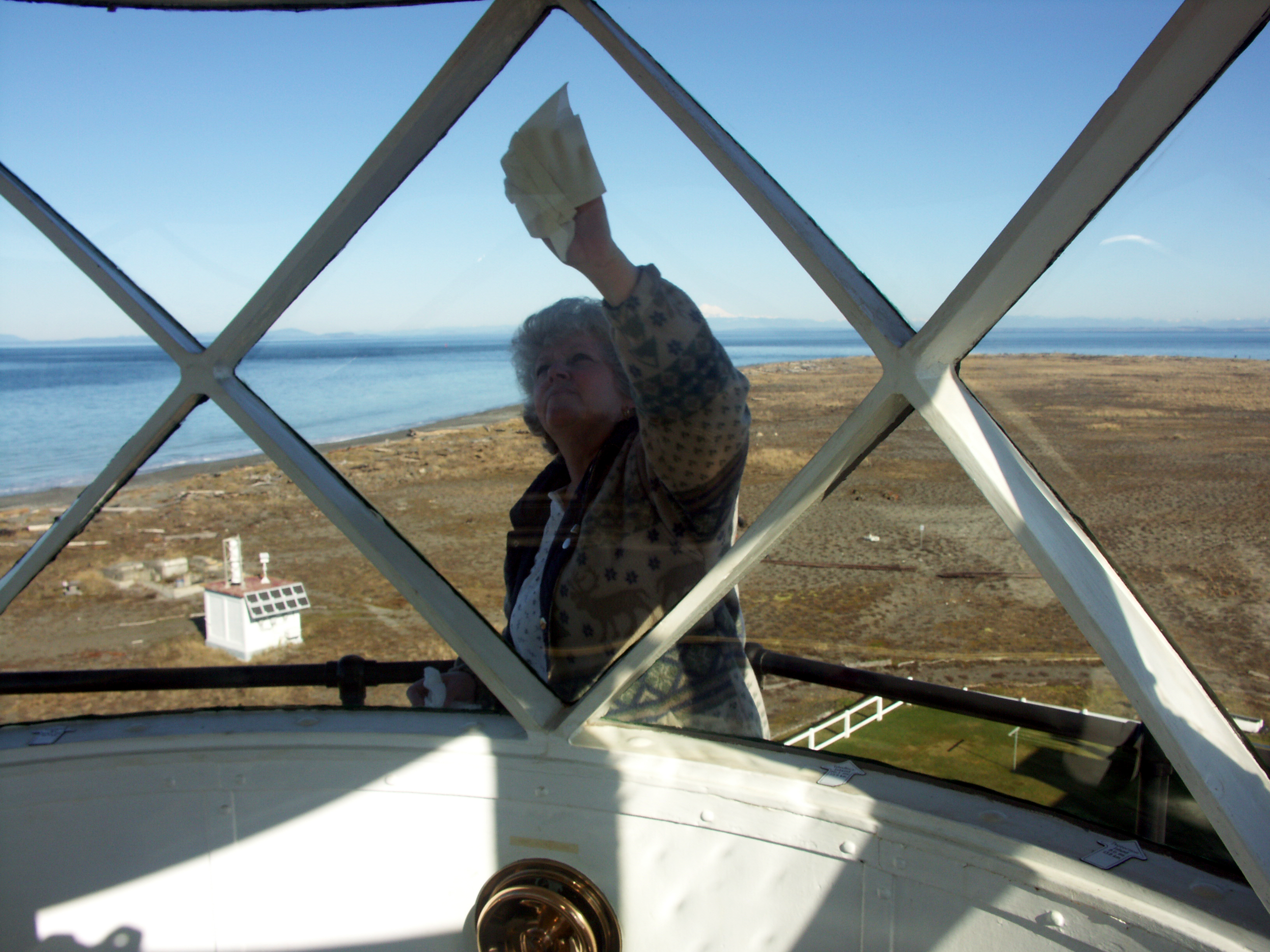
