= Mariners Weather Log =

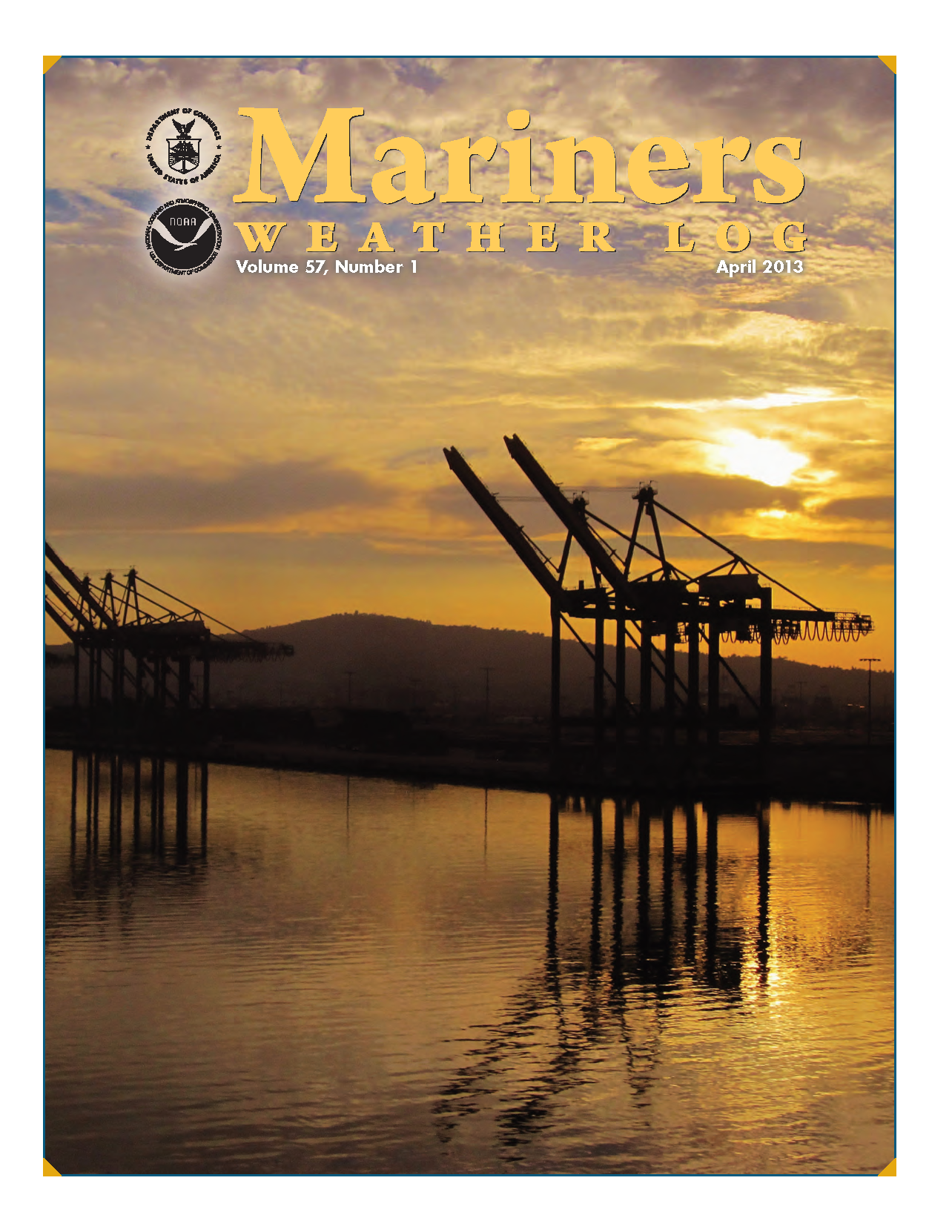
- Categories: Meteorology, shipping
- Frequency: thrice annually
- Publisher: National Oceanic and Atmospheric Administration
- First issue: 1957
- Country: United States
- Website: www.vos.noaa.gov/mwl.shtml
- ISSN: 0025-3367
- OCLC: 648466886

The Mariners Weather Log is a magazine published three times yearly by the United States Weather Bureau, the Environmental Science Services Administration, and the National Oceanic and Atmospheric Administration since 1957. It documents significant storms over and near the Earth's oceans and the Great Lakes of North America, tropical cyclones and extratropical cyclones alike. It is also used as an outreach tool to those who sail the high seas, in order to help gain greater weather reporting from ships at sea through the voluntary observing ship program, which became increasingly important during and after the decline of the weather ship and has taken up an increasing amount of the magazine recently. Although its coverage is primarily of the Northern Hemisphere, coverage of Southern Hemisphere tropical cyclones occurred between July 1973 and 1995.

== Purpose ==
The Mariners Weather Log (MWL) contains articles, news, and information about marine weather events, worldwide environmental impact concerns, climatology studies, storms at sea, and weather forecasting. MWL is dedicated to the National Weather Service (NWS) Voluntary Observing Ship (VOS) Program, Port Meteorological Officers (PMOs), cooperating ship officers, and their vessels. Through the MWL, the VOS program recognizes ship officers for their efforts as voluntary weather observers, and allows the NWS to maintain contact and communicate with over 10,000 shipboard observers worldwide in the merchant marine, National Oceanic and Atmospheric Administration Commissioned Corps, United States Coast Guard, United States Navy, and others. MWL is currently published triannually and is distributed via email to mariners, marine institutions, the shipping industry, scientists, educational and research facilities, libraries, government agencies, and offices worldwide in a digital high resolution format.

== Content ==
Throughout its history, there has been an Editor's Desk section, which discussed random items which came to the editor's attention since the previous issue. The Hints to the Observer section gave practical advice to those taking weather observations at sea and ran from the 1960s into the 1980s. The Tips to the Radio Officer section was included from the 1970s through the summer of 1995.

Another section was the Monthly Weather Log which documented significant extratropical and tropical cyclone occurrences across the northern Pacific and north Atlantic oceans through the summer of 1995. Through 1981, both a Rough Log and Smooth Log were included, with satellite images of weather systems being primarily included within the Rough Log, and the Smooth Log providing an update concerning systems discussed in the Rough Log during the previous issue, which included delayed ship reports. By 1982, the log format was simplified, with a single log being included to cover the prior three-month period, which substantially shrank the size of the publication. Starting in 1985, surface weather analyses began to be used on a more regular basis, taking the place of some of the many weather satellite images which were previously included. Maps of cyclone tracks were included within the Marine Weather Review section. Within or just after the Weather Logs, a list of ship and weather buoy observations with winds greater than gale-force was published until 1995. Summaries from weather ships were replaced with weather buoy summaries in January 1975.

Between July 1973 and 1995, a Hurricane Alley section was added in order to document recent global tropical cyclone occurrences since the publishing of the previous issue. Annual tropical cyclone season articles for the various basins are published early to mid year and discuss activity during the previous season. From the late 1980s through April 1998, a Whale Oil & Wicks column, authored by Elinor DeWire, detailed lighthouses and their keepers. At the end of the publication, a Marine Weather Diary was included during the 1960s and 1970s to detail average weather conditions across Northern Hemisphere waters during the succeeding couple months, to assist sailors out at sea. Since the 1980s, a list of VOS ships has been included near the end of the publication, which has significantly increased in its percentage of the publication size since then.

== Format ==
The physical size of the publication has changed through the years. Between the mid 1980s and 2012, the page size was a standard 8.5 inches (22 cm) by 11 inches (28 cm), though prior to 1985 the page size was closer to 8 inches (20 cm) by 10 inches (25 cm). Between the late 1960s and mid 1980s, the publication used glossy pages. Between 1957 and the late 1960s, as well as during the late 1980s through the 1990s, a non-glossy paper was used, which led to images which were less sharp and less distinct. Through 1997, the publication was bound with staples in the spine. Between 1998 and April 2012, the paper publication had a physical binding. Beginning in August 1998, MWL became available online. The April 2012 issue was the last print issue, with all following issues issued only in a digital format online.

== History ==
From 1957 through 1966, the United States Weather Bureau's Office of Climatology published the Mariners Weather Log. From 1966 through the summer of 1995, the Environmental Data Service, which became the National Environmental Satellite, Data, and Information Service, published the magazine. MWL was published bimonthly from its inception in 1957 into the early 1980s. It was subsequently published quarterly from the early 1980s through 1996. From 1995 onward, the National Weather Service dealt with its production and distribution. In 1997 only one issue was published, the spring issue. In 1998, the publication schedule lengthened to triannually.
