= 1949 Pacific hurricane season =

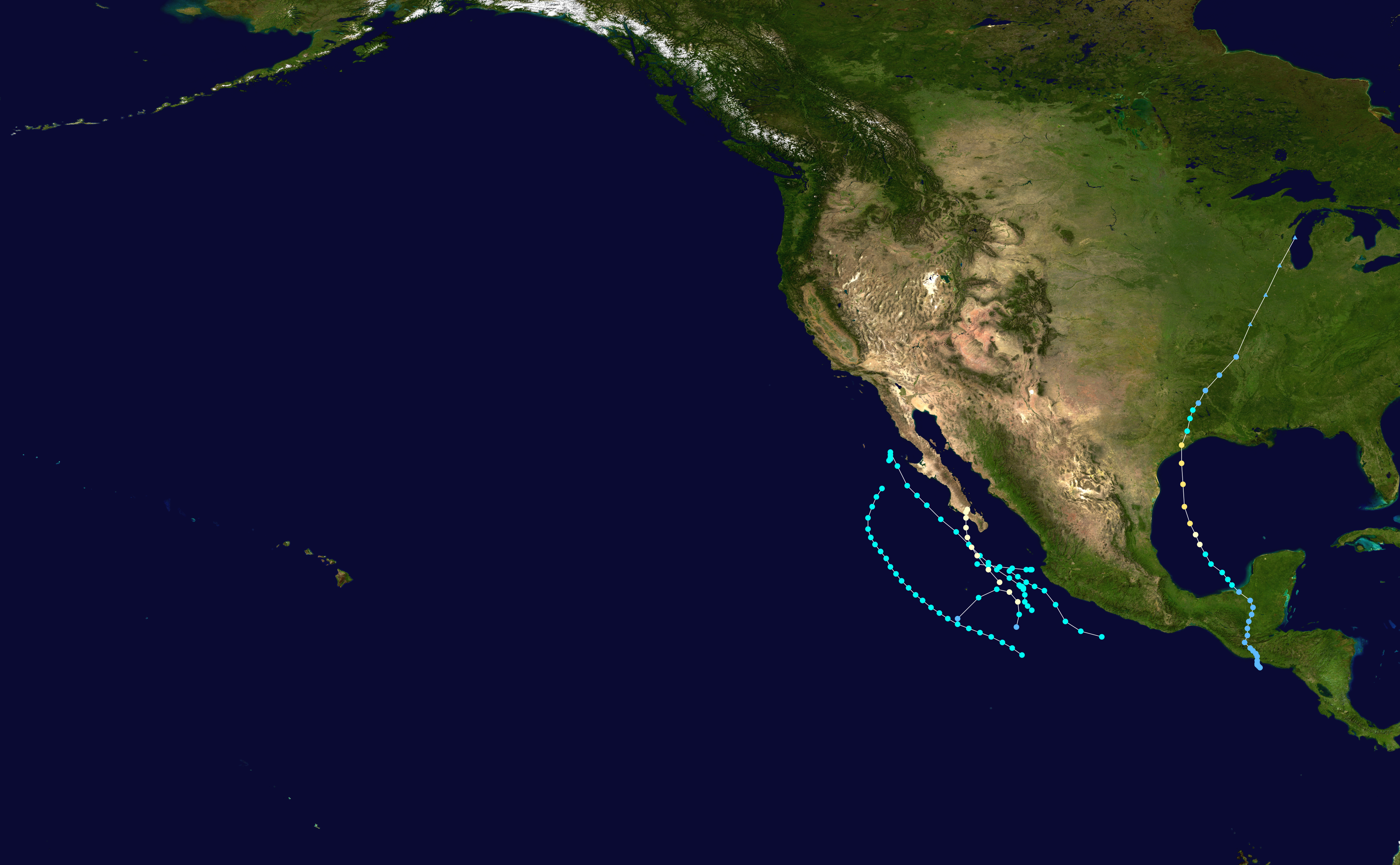
- Season summary map

Seasonal boundaries
- First system formed: June 11, 1949
- Last system dissipated: September 30, 1949

Strongest storm
- Name: Four and Six
  - Maximum winds: 85 mph (140 km/h)

Seasonal statistics
- Total depressions: 7
- Total storms: 6
- Hurricanes: 2
- Major hurricanes (Cat. 3+): 0
- Total fatalities: Unknown
- Total damage: Unknown

Related articles
- 1949 Atlantic hurricane season; 1949 Pacific typhoon season; 1940s North Indian Ocean cyclone seasons

The 1949 Pacific hurricane season was the first hurricane season in the Eastern Pacific hurricane database. Six tropical cyclones were known to have existed during the season, of which the first formed on June 11 and the final dissipated on September 30. Another tropical cyclone had formed within the basin in 1949, but was included in the Atlantic hurricane database, had it been classified operationally in the Eastern Pacific basin, would have tallied the overall season to seven tropical cyclones. In addition, there were two tropical cyclones that attained hurricane status, but none of them reached major hurricane intensity (Category 3 or higher on the Saffir–Simpson hurricane scale). Tropical Storm Three threatened the Baja California Peninsula, while an unnumbered hurricane crossed into the Atlantic, later becoming the 1949 Texas hurricane.

== Season summary ==
Tropical cyclones were recorded in the Eastern Pacific best track database for the first time in 1949. Although official records began in the Eastern Pacific during this year, the season saw the first officially recorded Atlantic-Pacific crossover tropical cyclone. This season was also beginning of a cool phase for the Pacific decadal oscillation.

Only six tropical cyclones were observed in the Eastern Pacific during this season, which is well below the 1949–2006 average of 13 per year. Of the six tropical cyclones, two only attained hurricane status. In addition, none of the tropical cyclones became a major hurricane, which is Category 3 or greater on Saffir–Simpson hurricane scale. Although it is an oddity for no major hurricanes to occur during a season since the satellite era began, nearly all hurricane seasons during this time period lacked a major hurricane. However, it is likely that other tropical cyclones in the Eastern Pacific basin in 1949 went operationally unnoticed, due to lack of modern technology such as satellite imagery. In addition to the six tropical cyclones, another tropical cyclone developed in the Eastern Pacific basin, but was included in the Atlantic basin hurricane database, rather than the Eastern Pacific. Most of the seven tropical cyclones did not differentiate in intensity during the duration, with the exception of Hurricane Six. The first two tropical cyclones of the season formed in quick succession during mid-June, however, the months of July and August went dormant in terms of tropical cyclogenesis. The last five tropical cyclones, including the additional storm, also developed in a quick sequence, all of which forming from in a span of 17 days. By October 1, all tropical cyclonic activity had completely ceased.

== Systems ==
=== Tropical Storm One ===
- Tropical storm (SSHWS)
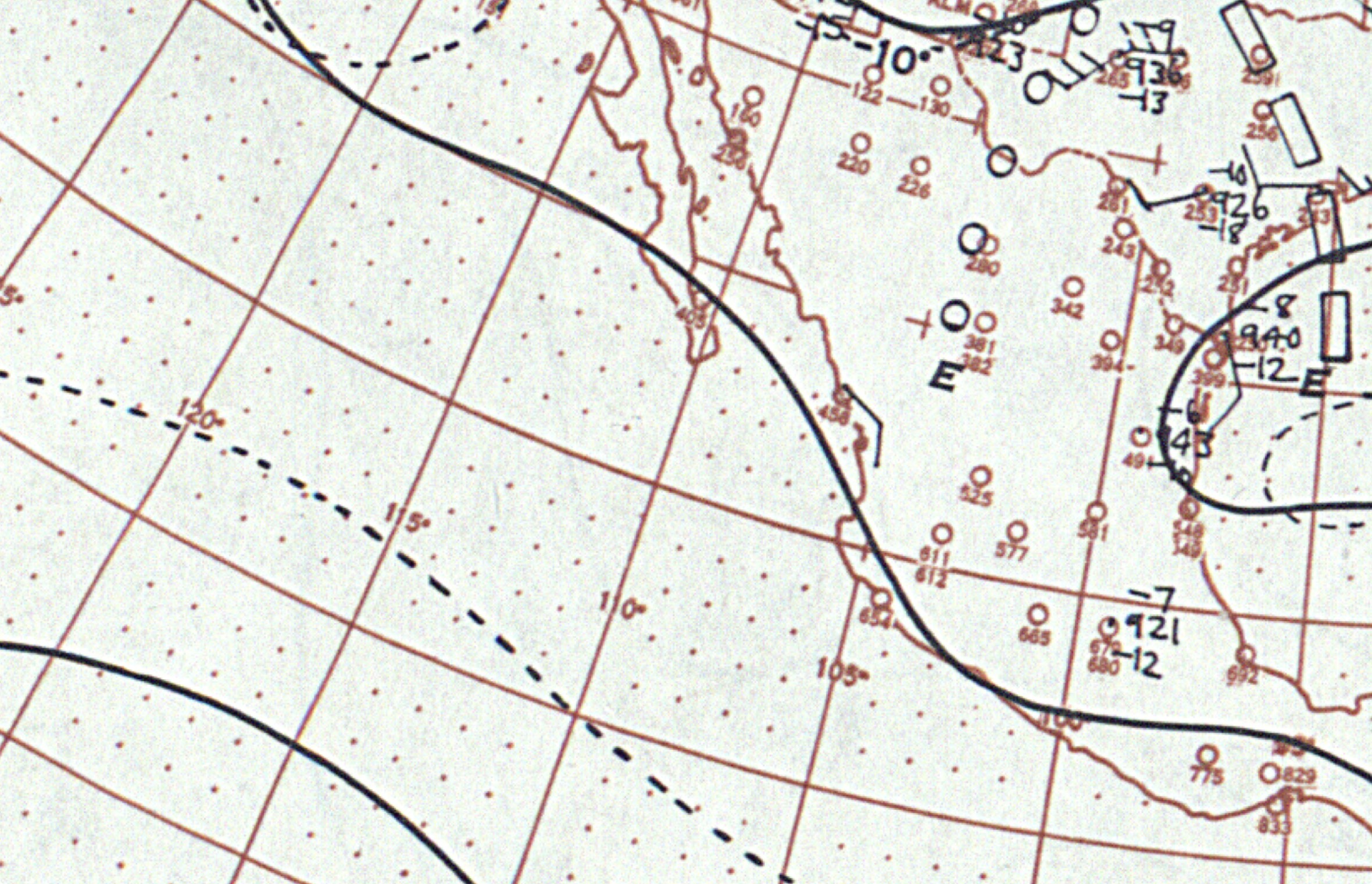
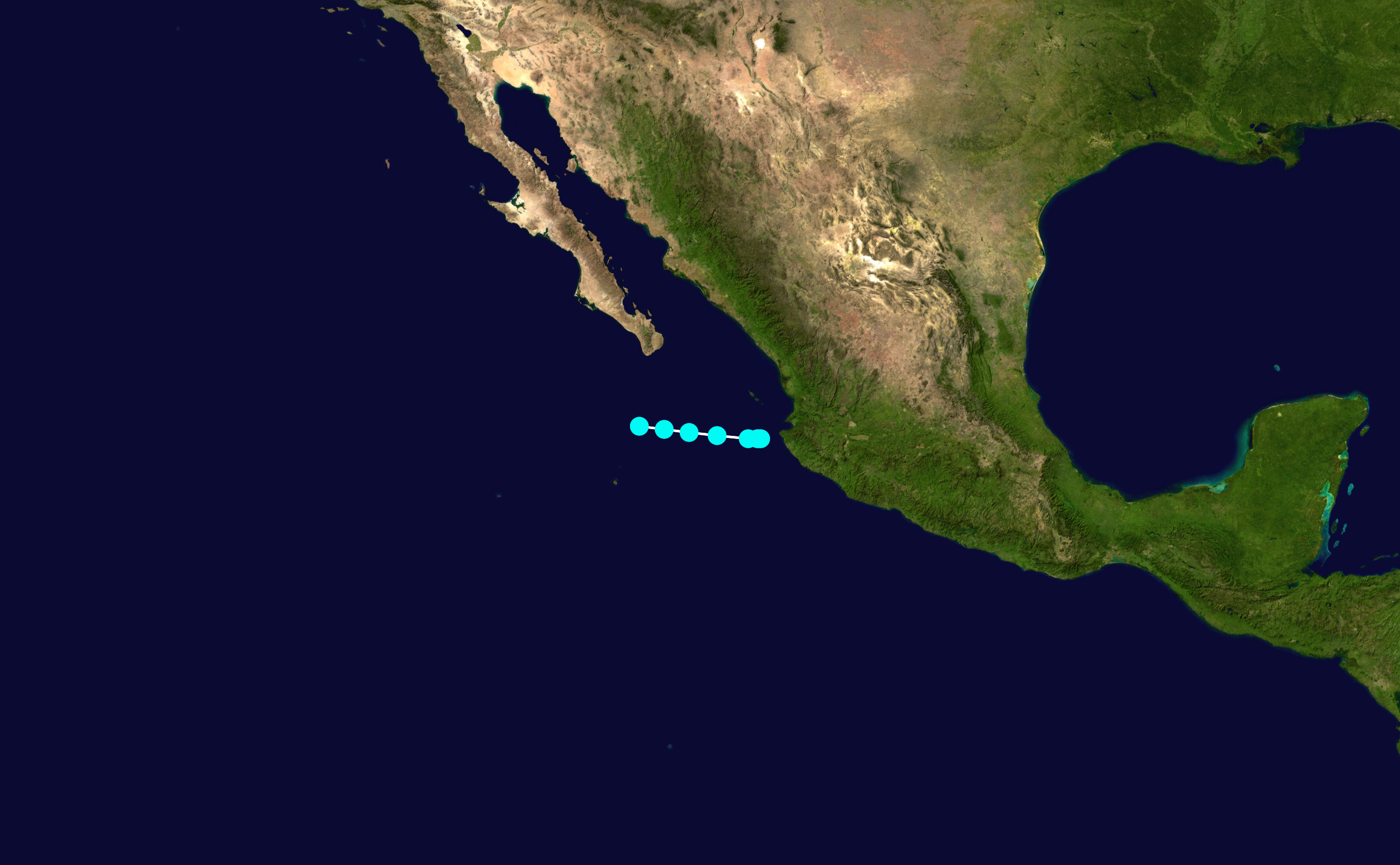
- Duration: June 11 – June 12
- Peak intensity: 50 mph (85 km/h) (1-min);

The first tropical storm of the season formed 75 mi (120 km) south-southwest of Puerto Vallarta on June 11. Tropical Storm One headed out to sea without intensifying further than 50 mph (80 km/h). Heading west-northwestward, the storm dissipated on July 12, centered roughly halfway between Socorro Island and Cabo San Lucas.

=== Tropical Storm Two ===
- Tropical storm (SSHWS)
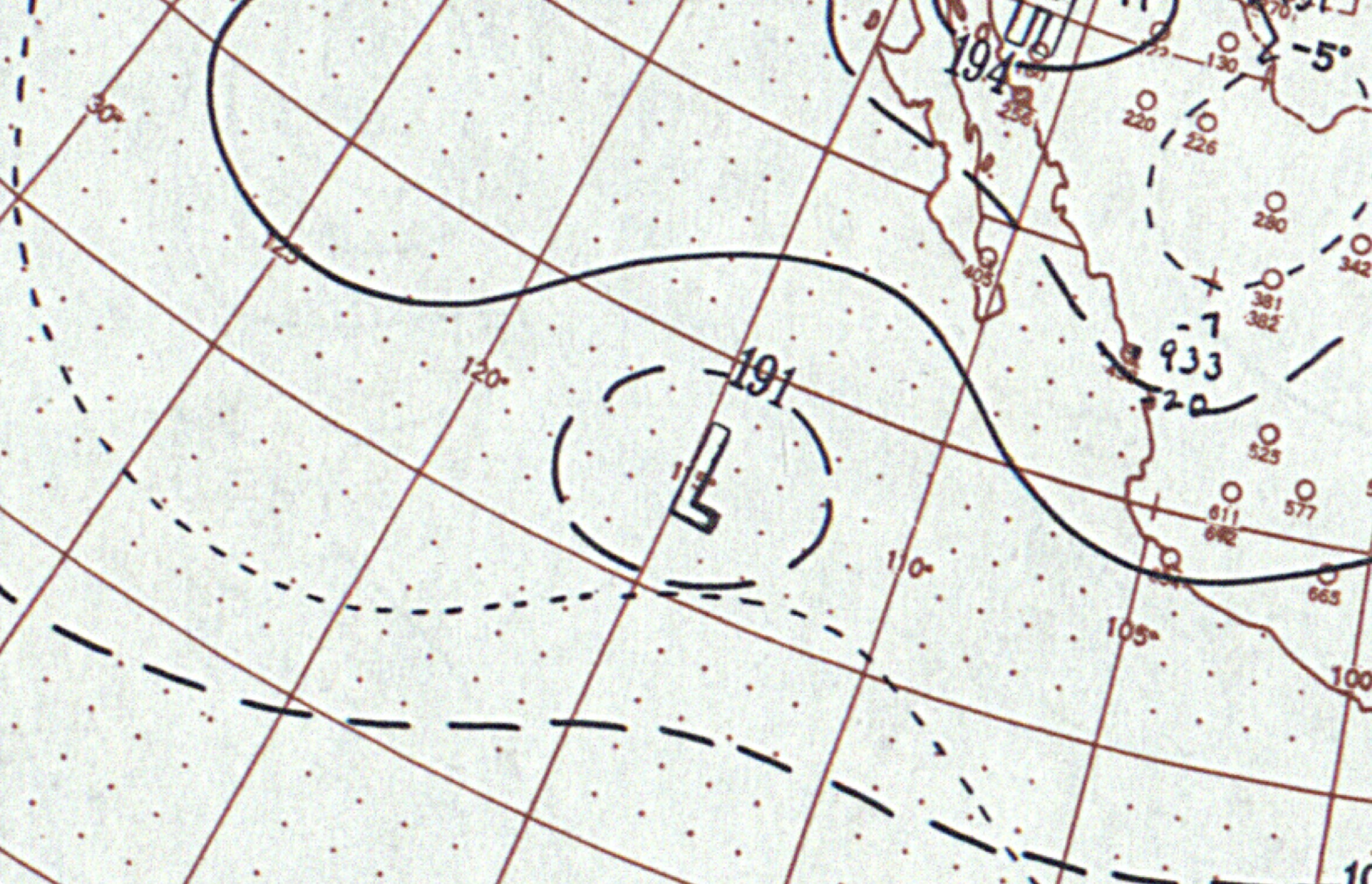
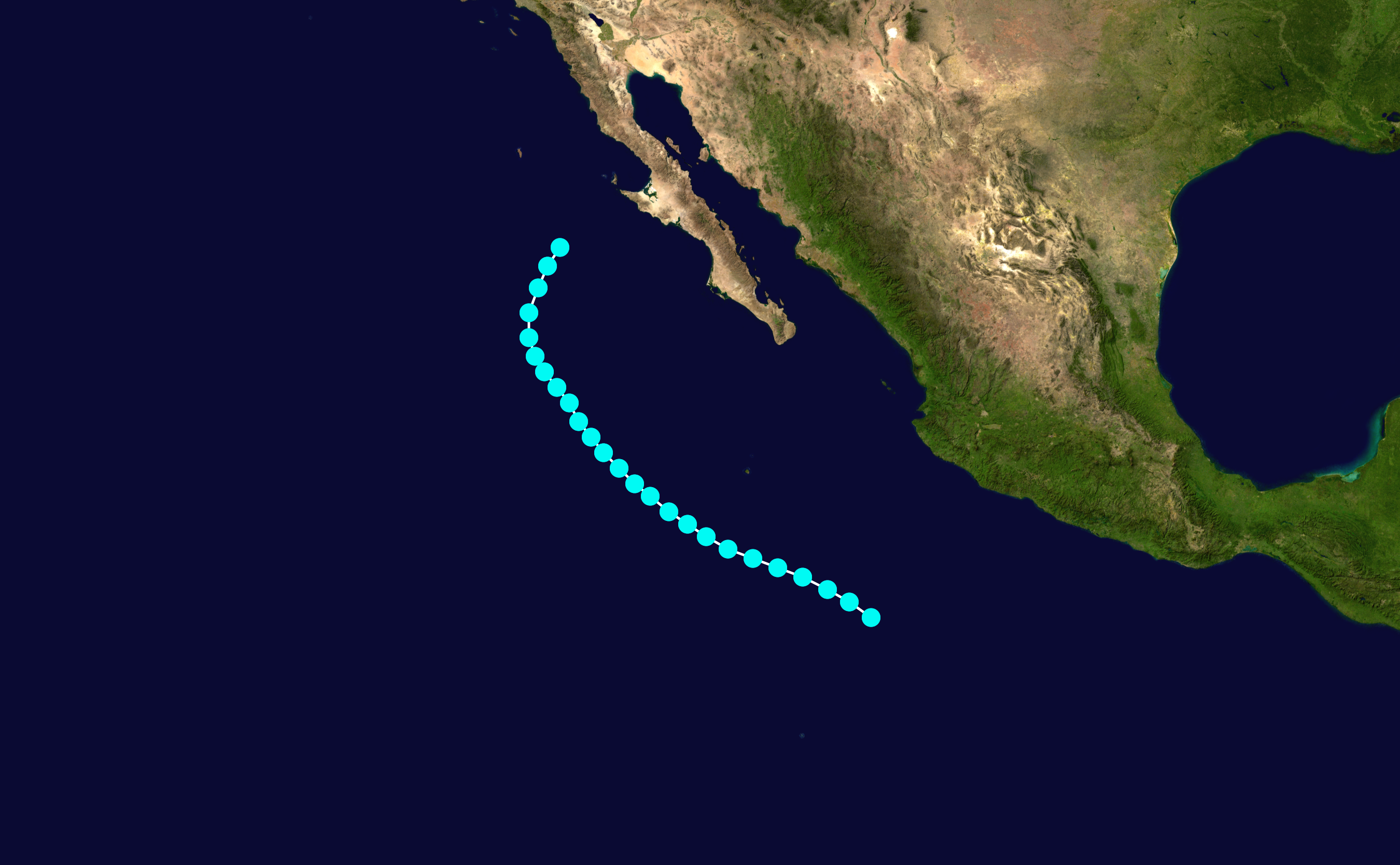
- Duration: June 17 – June 23
- Peak intensity: 50 mph (85 km/h) (1-min);

Tropical Storm Two was first observed 440 mi (705 km) southwest of Zihuatanejo on June 16. While remaining far west of the Mexican coast, Two peaked as a 50 mph (80 km/h) tropical storm. No change in intensity occurred, and the tropical storm dissipated southwest of Baja California at 1200 UTC June 23.

=== Tropical Storm Three ===
- Tropical storm (SSHWS)
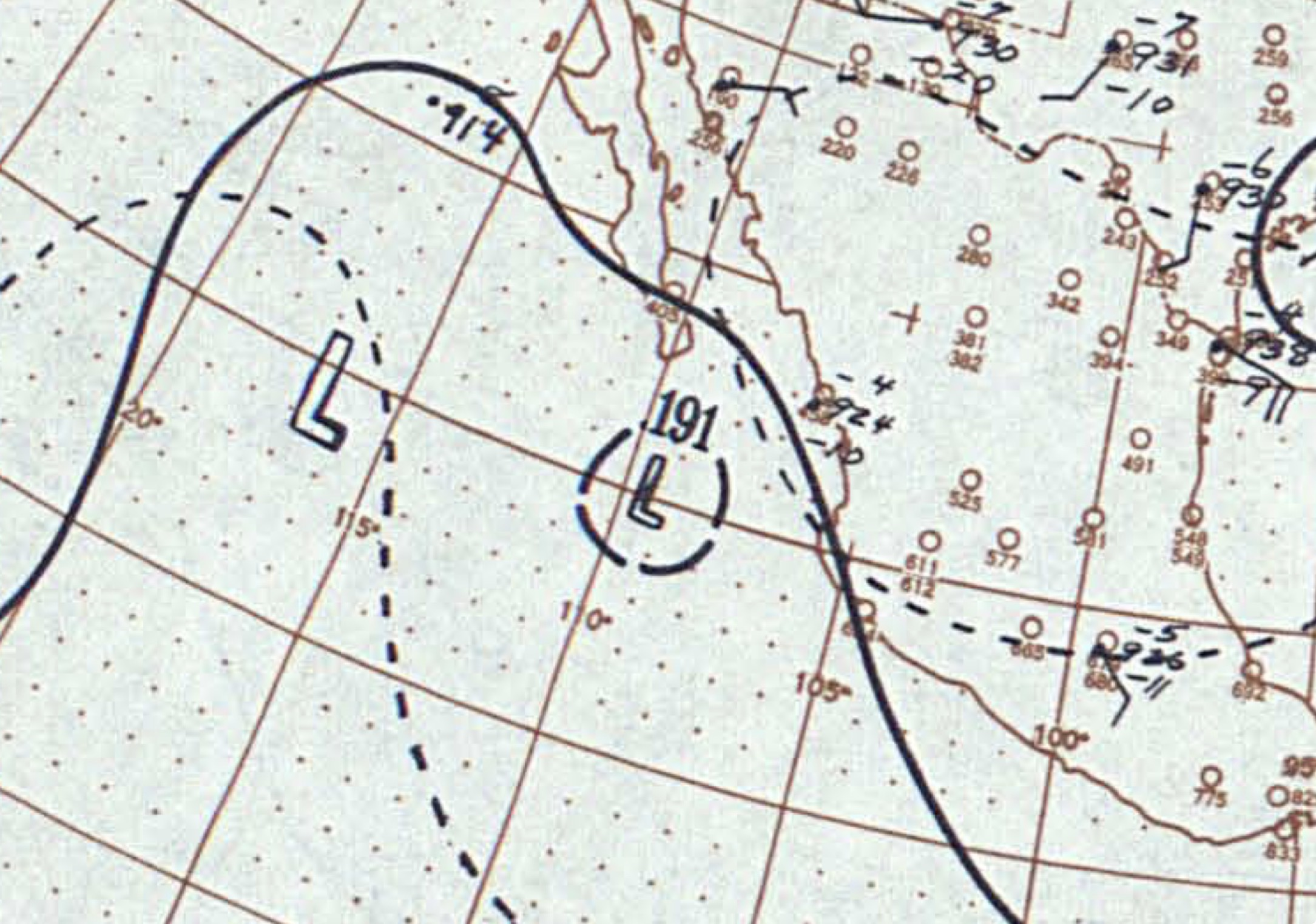
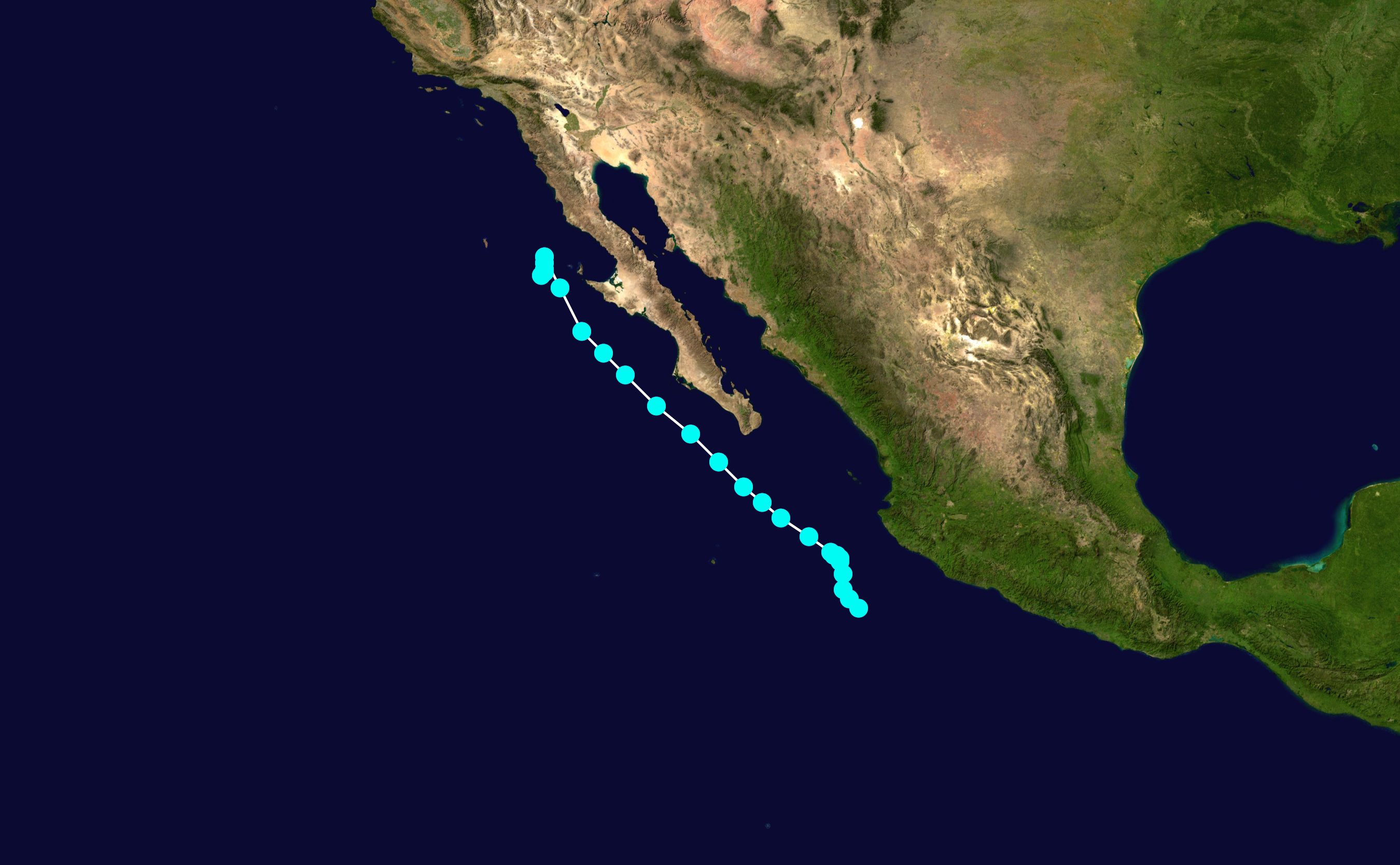
- Duration: September 3 – September 9
- Peak intensity: 50 mph (85 km/h) (1-min);

After no tropical cyclone activity in July and August, the third tropical storm formed offshore of southwestern Mexico on September 3. Like the previous two tropical cyclone, this storm had a peak of 50 mph (80 km/h), and did not intensify further. Tropical Storm Three headed northwestward, and began paralleling the coast of Baja California. On September 8, Tropical Storm Three turned abruptly south-southwestward, and dissipated by the next day. The outer rainbands of this system were expected to bring squally weather over the Baja California Peninsula; instead, this storm turned away without causing any impact.

=== Hurricane Four ===
- Category 1 hurricane (SSHWS)
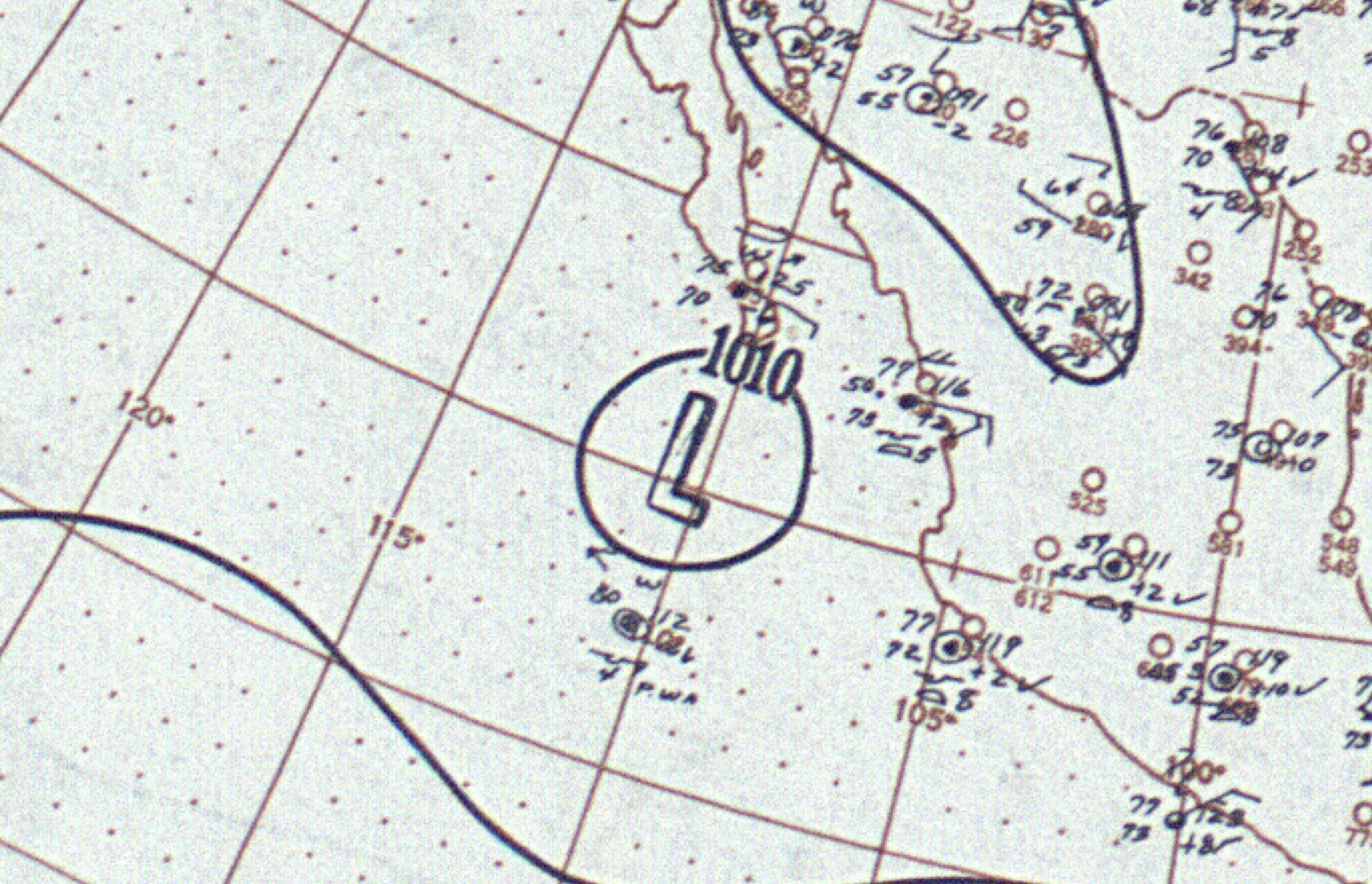
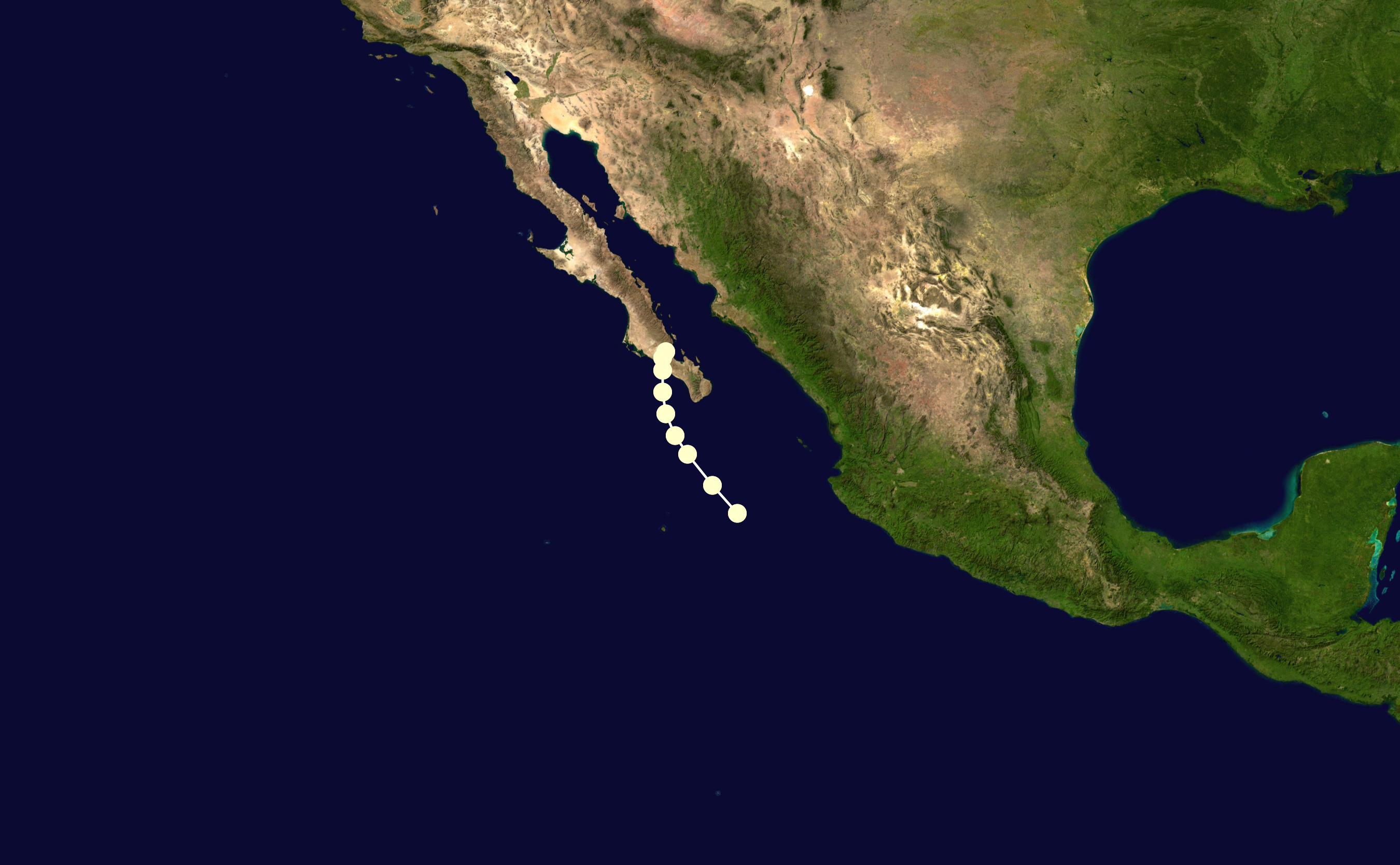
- Duration: September 9 – September 11
- Peak intensity: 85 mph (140 km/h) (1-min);

The first hurricane of the season developed on September 9 while located 160 mi (260 km) east-southeast of Socorro Island, and tied Hurricane Six as the strongest tropical cyclone of the season. The hurricane slowly turned northward, and made landfall in Baja California Sur with winds of 85 mph (140 km/h) on September 11. Hurricane Six dissipated over Baja California about 10 hours later. Since Four was expected to bring high waves and rough seas to Southern California, all marine operates and other interests in the region were alerted.

=== Tropical Storm Five ===
- Tropical storm (SSHWS)
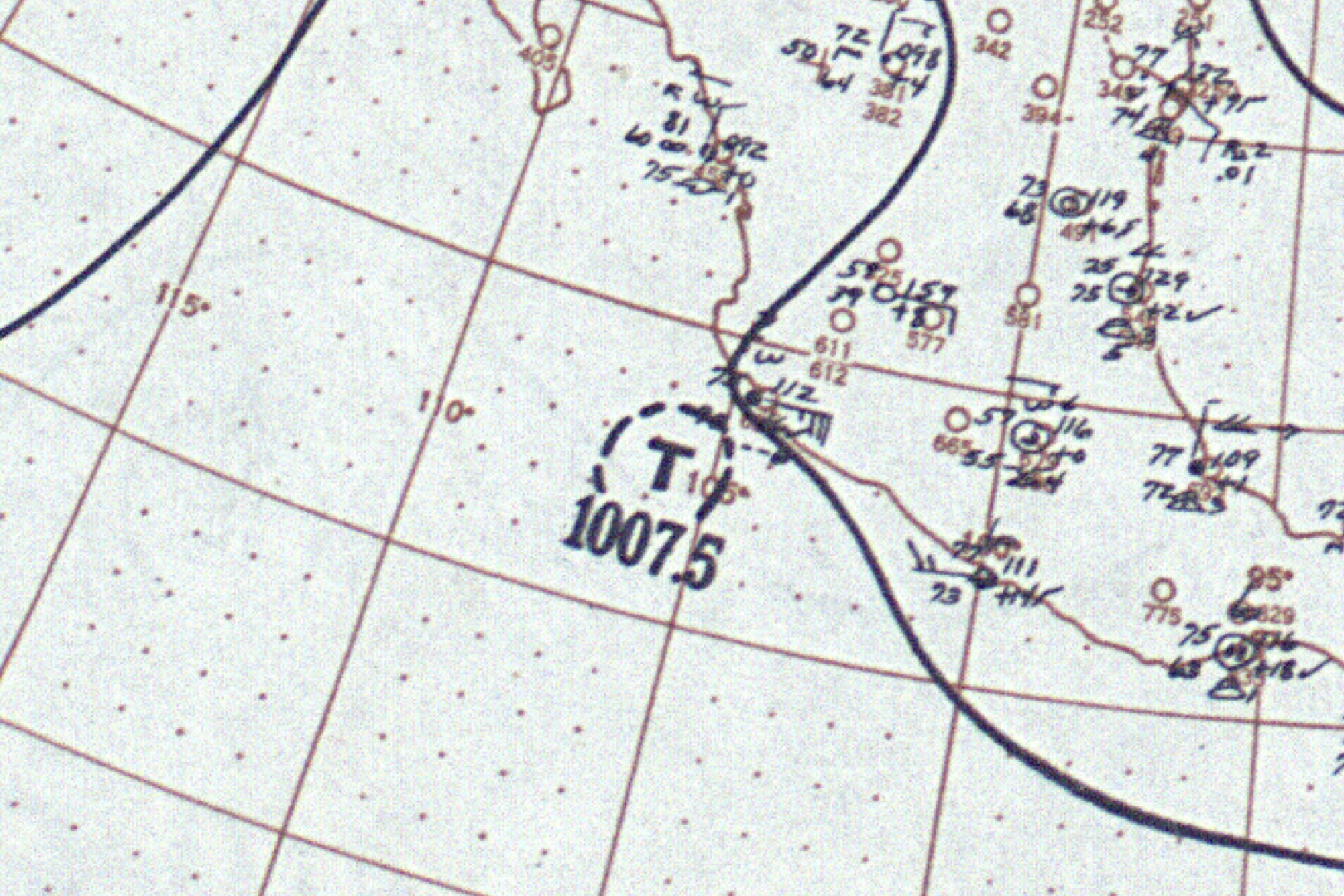
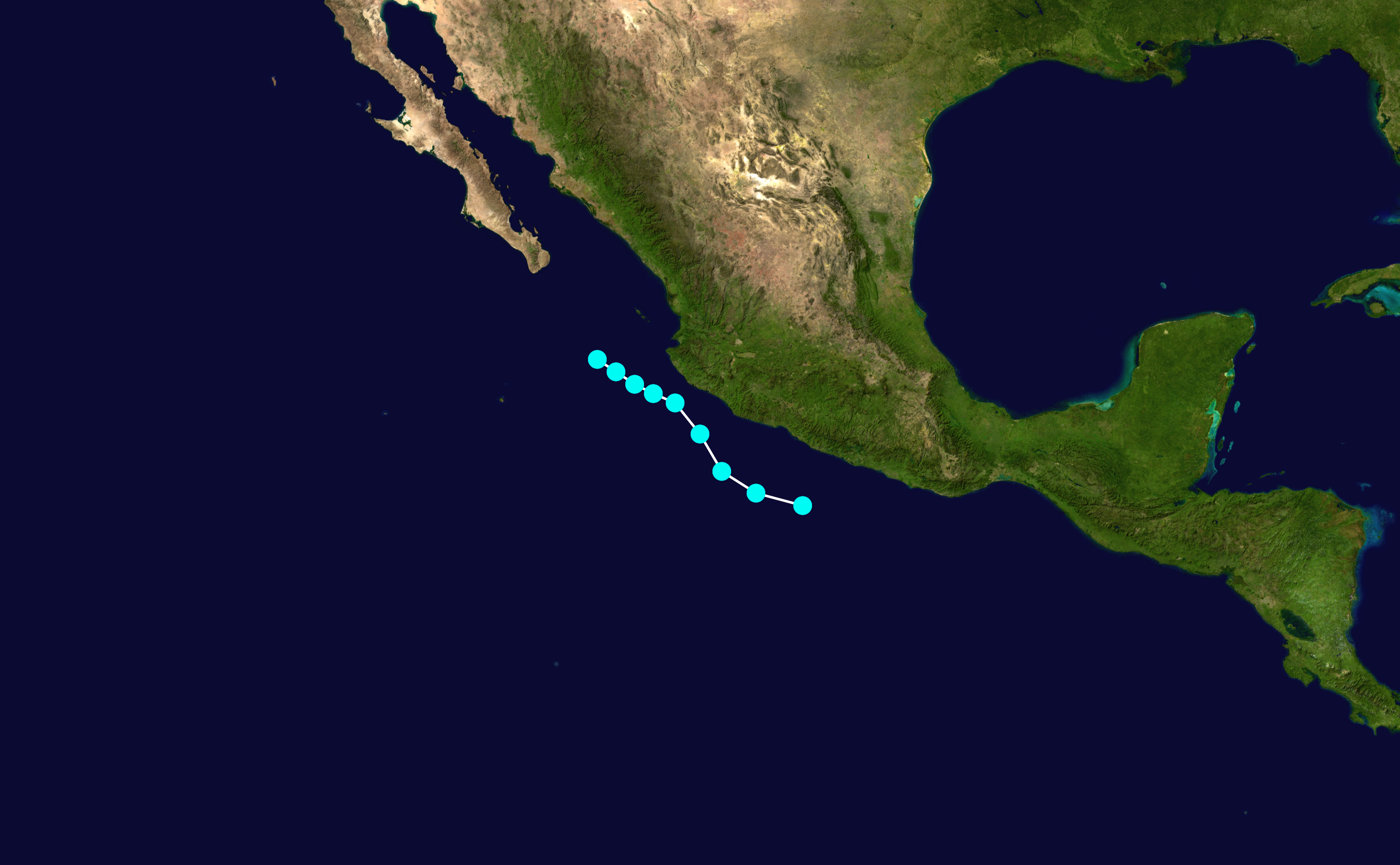
- Duration: September 17 – September 19
- Peak intensity: 50 mph (85 km/h) (1-min);

The fifth tropical storm was observed offshore of Mexico, on September 17. Tropical Storm Five had no change in intensity past a 50 mph (85 km/h) tropical storm, similar to Tropical Storms One, Two, and Three. While paralleling the coast of Mexico, Tropical Storm Five passed only 75 mi (120 km) southwest of Manzanillo. The tropical storm curved northwestward on September 18, and headed out to sea. The system dissipated 135 mi (215 km) west-southwest of Islas Marías on September 19.

=== Unnumbered tropical depression ===
- Tropical depression (SSHWS)
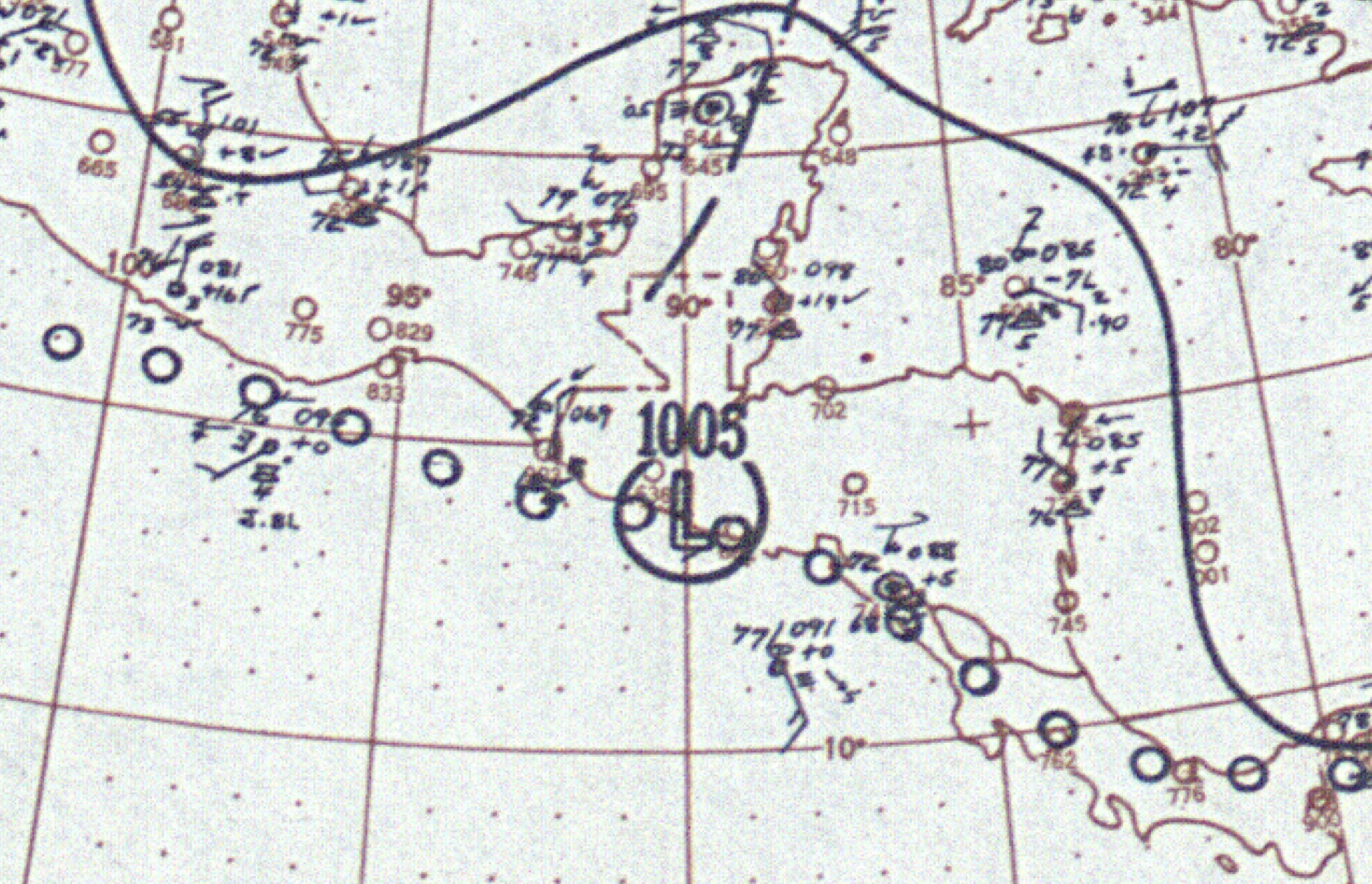
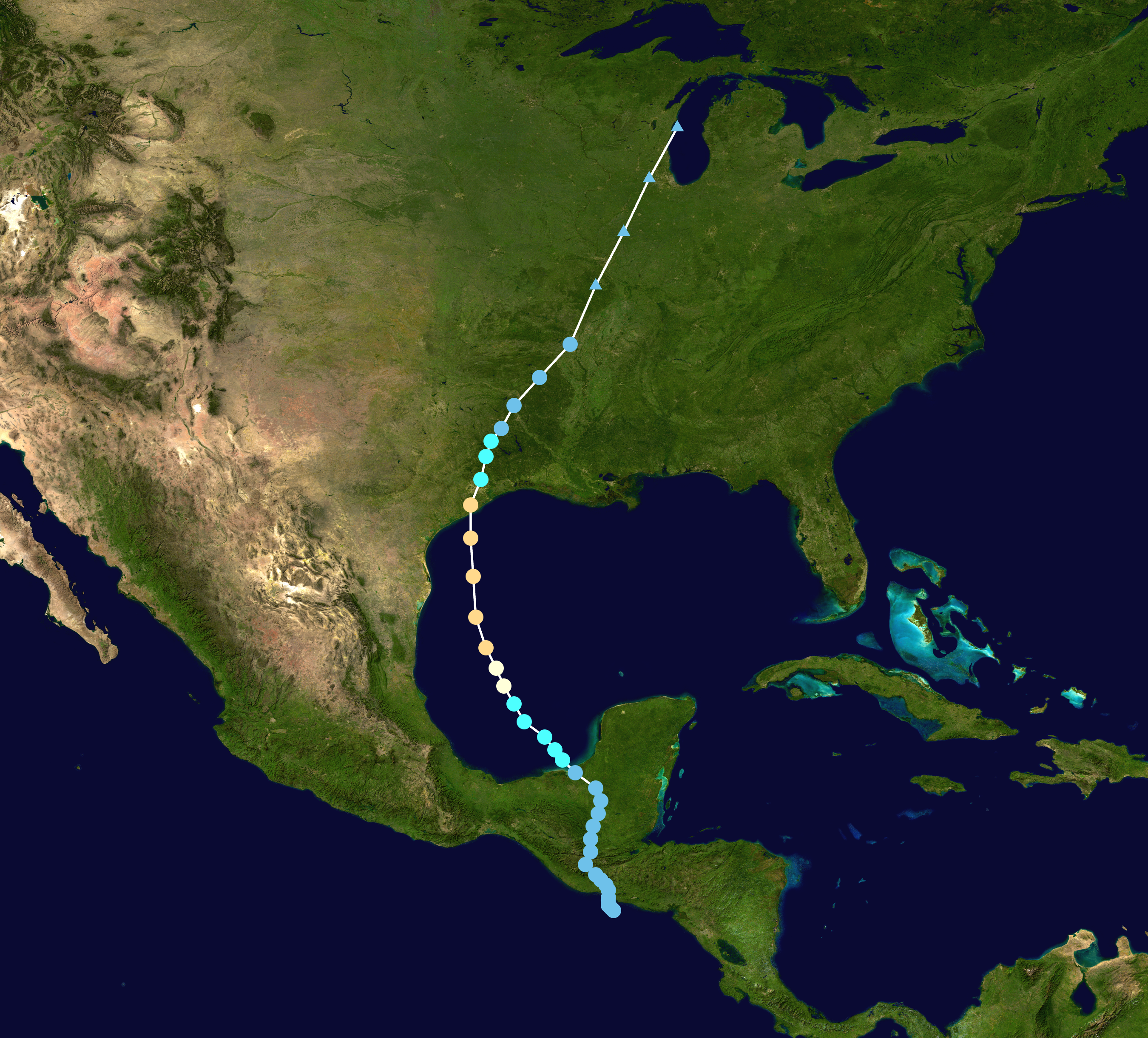
- Duration: September 27 – October 1 (Left basin)
- Peak intensity: 35 mph (55 km/h) (1-min);

In addition to the six tropical cyclones in the basin, another system September 27, although it was not included with the records in the East Pacific, the storm had been listed as Hurricane Ten in the Atlantic basin. Forming south of El Salvador, the tropical depression traveled slowly north. Failing to intensify past a beyond depression status, the system made landfall near the border of Guatemala and El Salvador on September 28. Moving inland, the storm did not weaken as it crossed through Guatemala and Mexico. The system quickly strengthened once over the Bay of Campeche, becoming a tropical storm. After entering the bay, the storm intensified into a hurricane, and eventually made landfall in Texas as a Category 2 hurricane. This hurricane was the first officially recorded Atlantic-Pacific crossover tropical cyclone. Overall, monetary losses totaled $10 million (1949 USD) and two deaths were attributed to the storm.

=== Hurricane Six ===
- Category 1 hurricane (SSHWS)
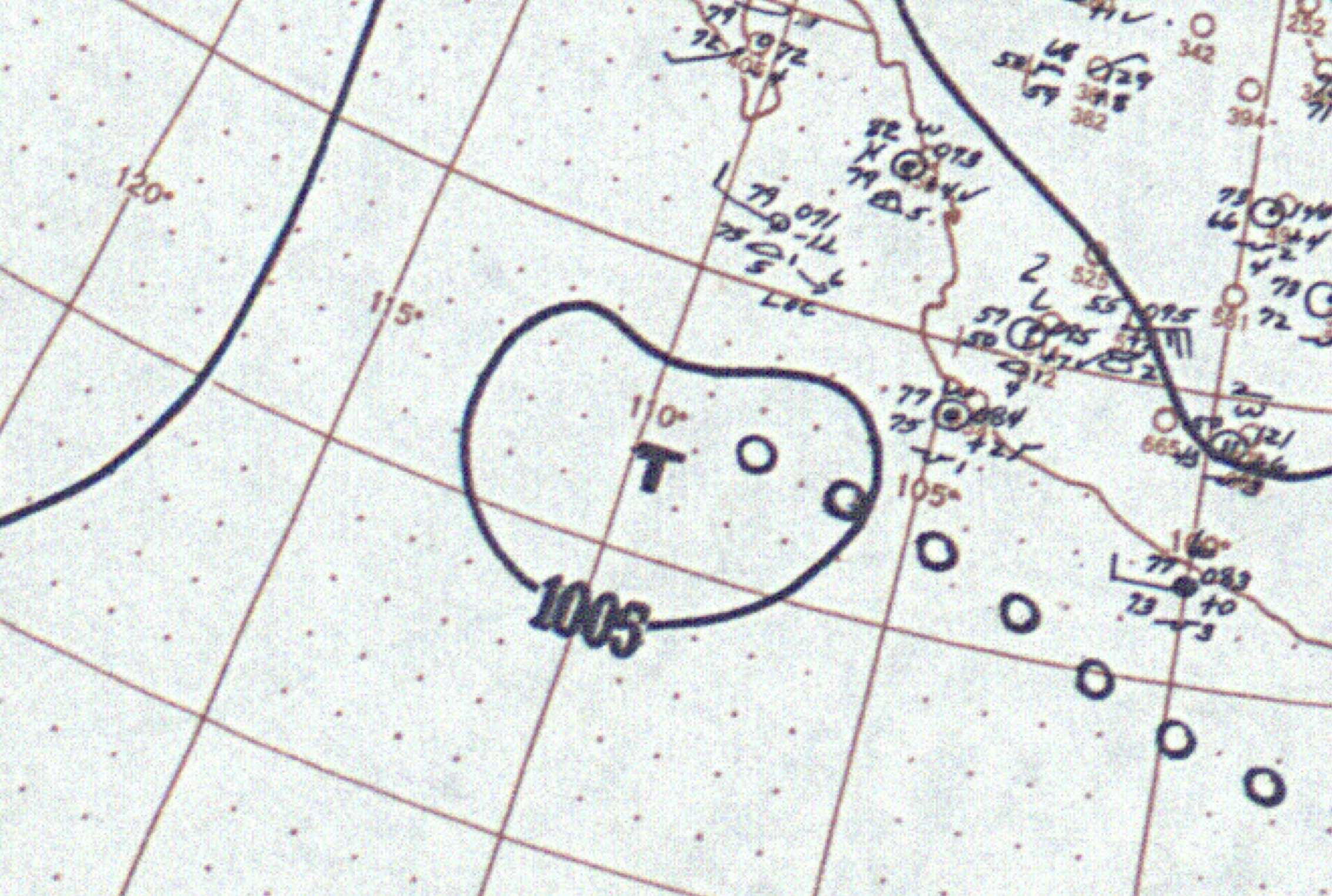
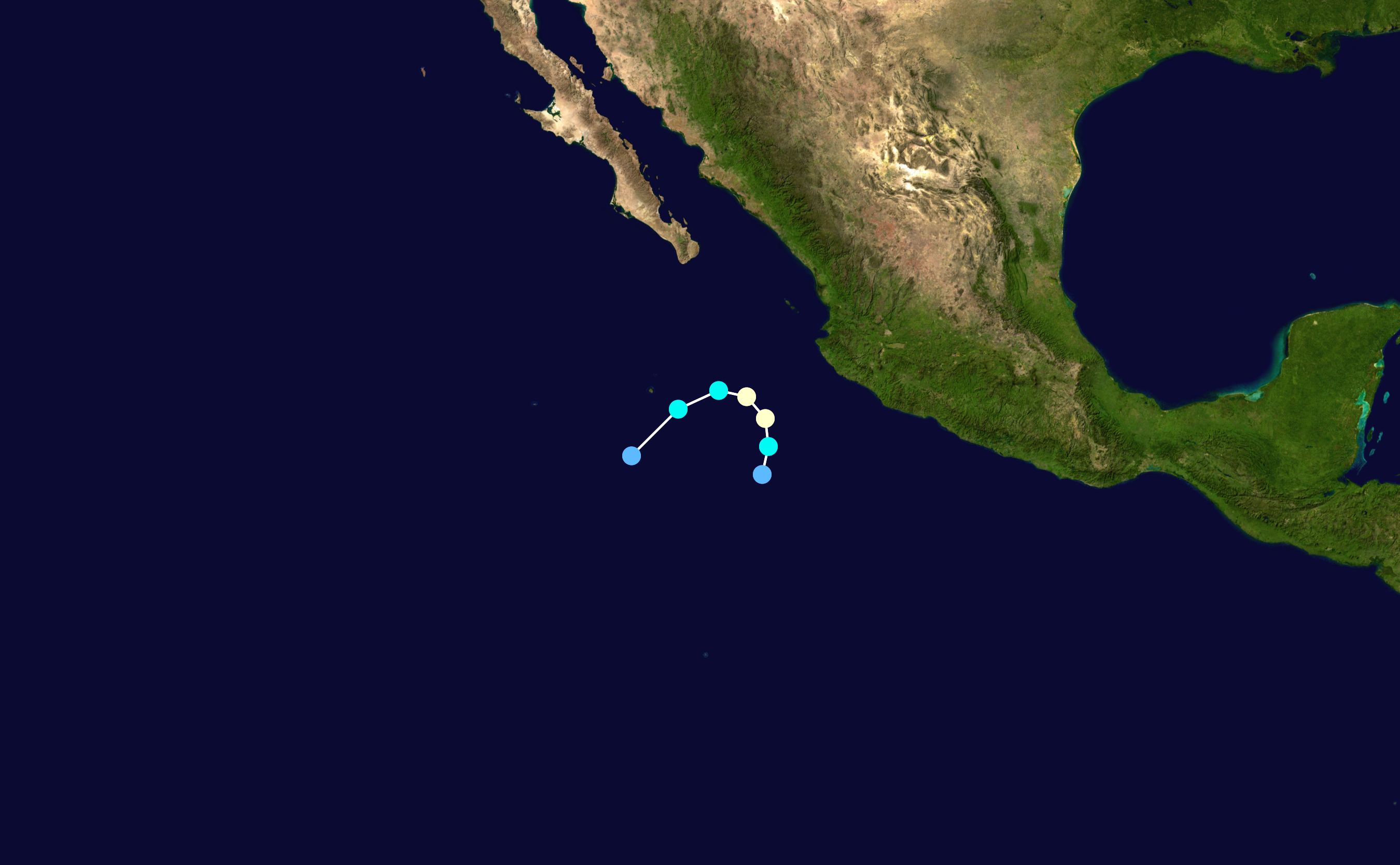
- Duration: September 29 – September 30
- Peak intensity: 85 mph (140 km/h) (1-min);

A tropical depression was first observed 300 mi (485 km) southeast of Socorro Island on September 29. The depression rapidly intensified, and was a Category 1 hurricane only twelve hours after being first observed. Peaking as an 85 mph (140 km/h) Category 1 hurricane, Hurricane Six tied Hurricane Four as the strongest tropical cyclone of the season. After reaching its peak intensity, Hurricane Six rapidly weakened, and passed 70 mi (125 km) southeast of Socorro Island with winds of 50 mph (85 km/h). Further weakening occurred, and the storm had dissipated on September 30.

== See also ==
- List of Pacific hurricanes
- 1949 Atlantic hurricane season
- 1949 Pacific typhoon season
- 1949 North Indian Ocean cyclone season
- Australian region cyclone seasons: 1948–49 1949–50
- South Pacific cyclone seasons: 1948–49 1949–50
- South-West Indian Ocean cyclone seasons: 1948–49 1949–50
