= Conservation and restoration of lighthouses =

Preservation of building structures

The conservation and restoration of lighthouses is when lighthouse structures are preserved through detailed examination, cleaning, and in-kind replacement of materials. Given the wide variety of materials used to construct lighthouses, a variety of techniques and considerations are required. Lighthouses alert seagoers of rocky shores nearby and provide landmark navigation. They also act as a physical representation of maritime history and advancement. These historic buildings are prone to deterioration due to their location on rocky outcrops of land near the water, as well as severe weather events, and the continued rise of sea levels. Given these conditions preservation and conservation efforts have increased.

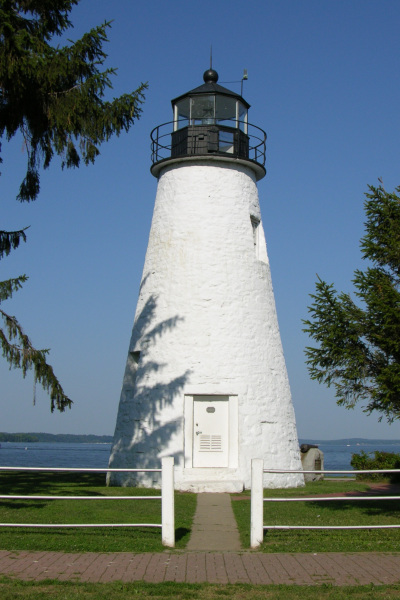
Havre De Grace Lighthouse

== Exterior ==
=== Ground ===
The ground consists of the land, outbuildings, and landscape that the lighthouse property sits on. The grounds may also include buildings from other time periods. The types of buildings, their relationship to one another, their location over the whole of the property, types of flora and their location, and potential archaeological sites (if they have been identified), are all aspects that should be considered during conservation of the property.

Outbuildings are prone to deterioration because they were often used for storage and were not maintained to the same standards as the lighthouse. Former repairs to buildings may have used inexpensive materials as a temporary fix. These materials often degrade making the building unstable. Any buildings that remain intact and in their original location are historically important to the relationship and usage of the lighthouse. Materials, colors, and details are all representative of the lighthouse when it was active and are often considered during the preservation process.

=== Coatings ===
==== Paint ====
Lighthouse exterior paint was often used in colorful patterns to act as a day marker. Paint was also used to help protect the exterior structure of the lighthouse from wear. Evidence of paint degradation include crazing, cracking, peeling between coats, blistering, and wrinkling. Repair can be made through spot treatments or through a complete replacement of the paint. Original paint was made of lead and tended to withstand harsh conditions while still protecting the structure. The required use of National Historic Preservation approved paints has proved difficult as they do not work well with the lighthouse structure's original materials Most repainting projects will have to begin with removal of the original base coat, followed by a thorough surface cleaning to remove impurities, then ended with a complete repainting of the structure.

==== Stucco ====
Stucco has been traditionally used as a protective barrier on the exterior of lighthouses. Stucco is made up of fine granular particles mixed together with a binder. The composition of stucco has changed significantly over the years and may require laboratory analysis to determine the makeup. Most of the problems with stucco arise from prolonged contact with water or moisture which breaks down the structure of the particles and binder. In addition, the texture of stucco is prone to removal when abraded. As with most preservation, gentle cleaning of the surface can help remove dirt and impurities and inhibit further deterioration.

=== Iron ===
Iron was a popular material used in lighthouse construction. Multiple types of iron were used including: cast iron, wrought iron, steel, galvanized iron, galvanized steel, and stainless steel. Cast iron was the most popular material because it resists corrosion and can be cast into a multitude of shapes. Though iron is sturdy it can be prone to deterioration through corrosion (oxidation, galvanic corrosion, and graphitization), weathering, and flaws from the manufacturing process. Degradation of iron is visible through pitting, cracks, erosion, rust, blistering, flaking, and scaling.

Preservation and restoration of iron should be completed using the least invasive approach possible. Iron is strong but can be easily damaged through improper or harsh procedures.

=== Masonry ===
The masonry component of a lighthouse is made up of the bricks and stones on the exterior. Damage to masonry is primarily caused by water, salt accumulation, expansion and contraction, abrasion, poor ventilation, and inappropriate cleaning techniques (ex. sandblasting). Masonry may show many signs of deterioration to include: bulges, cracks, efflorescence, erosion, flaking, sloping or uneven settlement, mold or mildew, missing stones or bricks, condensation buildup, and blistering.

==== Cleaning of Masonry ====
Basic preservation of lighthouse masonry usually includes gentle surface cleaning. Appropriate methods for cleaning are determined by the type of masonry that exists on the building. Some cleaning methods include water, chemical, and laser. There are multiple water cleaning methods. Soaking is a process where the masonry undergoes a prolonged exposure to misting water to remove dirt. Water washing uses a light to medium pressurized stream of water. Some water washing may use the addition of detergents to increase dirt removal. Chemical cleaning is also an option, but may be too harsh depending on the makeup of the masonry. Chemical cleaners are either acidic or alkaline. Laser cleaning is effective, mostly on smaller areas of masonry, but can be costly. Due to the differences in materials and construction techniques, only an experienced architectural conservator should be contacted for conservation or restoration work.

=== Wood ===
Wood was either used for construction on the exterior or in combination with masonry and/or iron to build components of the lighthouse (ex. stairs). The largest cause for deterioration of wood in lighthouses is from exposure to moisture. This exposure is normally the result of direct and prolonged exposure to damp conditions. Other causes for deterioration include pests, fungus, and insects. Some signs of decomposition include cracking, bulging, holes, peeling paint, leaning of the structure, gaps between joints, and exposed bare wood.

Some complications from wood deterioration can be solved through tight fitting seals around windows and doors, gutter systems, caulking of seams and joints, and sloping away of decking from the structure. Regular cleaning of the surface may also help reduce accumulated residues on the wood thereby prolonging its usable life. The most common treatment for replacing degraded wood is to use a splicing technique where new pieces of wood are joined with original wood features. For severe cases, large in-kind replacements may be necessary.

=== Concrete ===
Concrete was first added to lighthouses to reinforce them from earthquakes. Concrete can mean a variety of compositions including sand, gravel, and crushed stone bound with lime or cements. It was used in both the surfaces and features of the lighthouse.

Despite its durability, maintenance, repair techniques, and abrasive cleaners can cause damage to the concrete. Environmental factors are the main cause of concrete deterioration, mainly the freeze-thaw cycles that allow moisture to be absorbed into the concrete, causing cracks, erosion, corrosion, deflection, and spalling. Analysis and testing are key to maintaining and repairing concrete used on lighthouses.

To prevent incoming moisture, it is ideal to ensure that any possible cracks are made weathertight. It is important to allow maximum ventilation, especially in the summer months, to eliminate interior condensation. This ventilation can be achieved through a mounted passive louver system. A protective coating of either paint, stucco, or lime-mortar-wash is typically applied to concrete lighthouses as a layer of defense from external elements.

== Interior ==
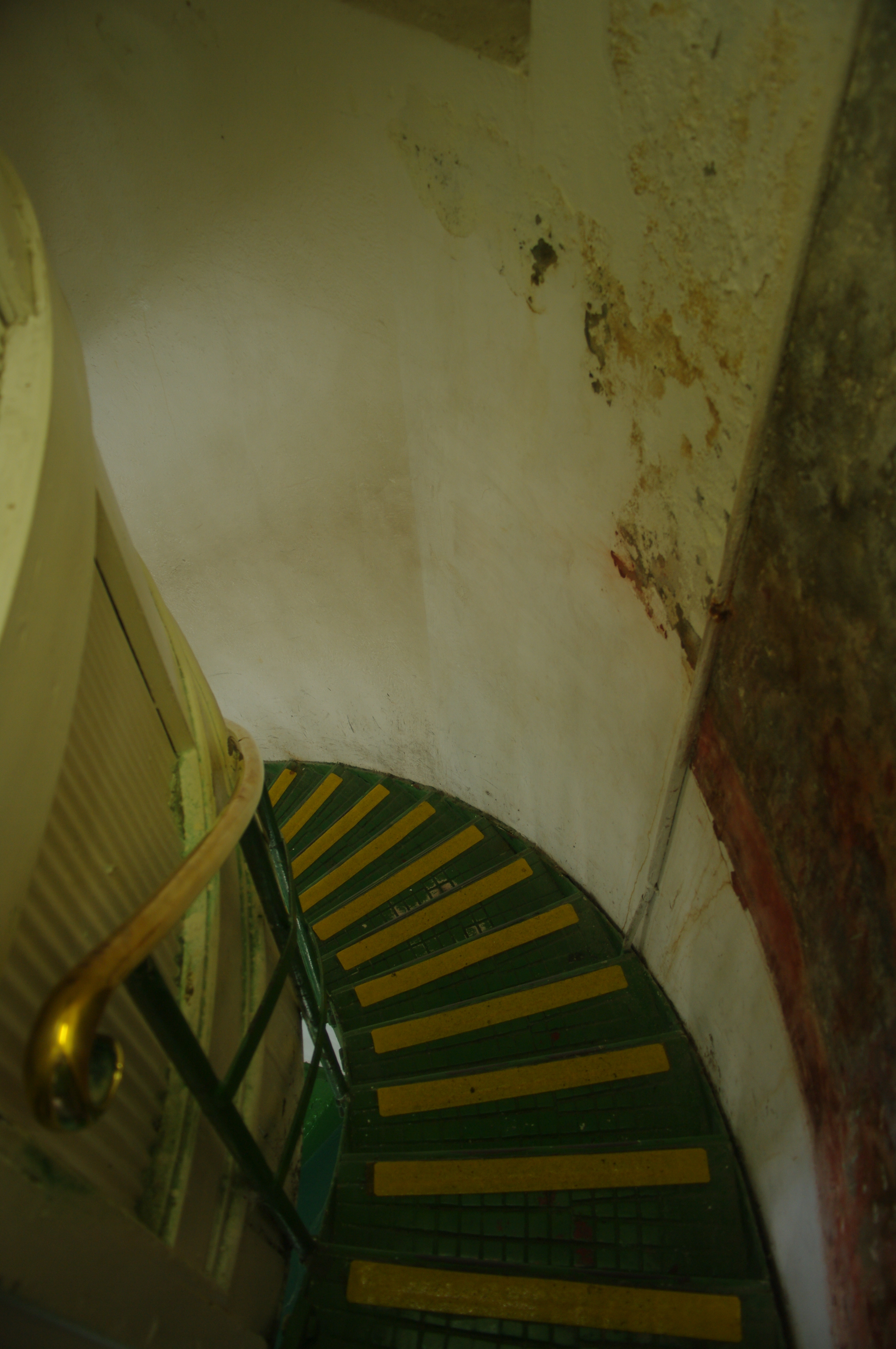
Rusted interior of a lighthouse

Most lighthouse interiors were simple in construction and decoration unless used as part of the light keeper's residence. Addressing issues on the exterior is required first to protect the inside of the structure.

=== Deterioration ===
A majority of the lighthouse interiors' issues stem from moisture, condensation, neglect, or inappropriate treatments.

Neglect causes deterioration due to lack of cleaning, regular maintenance of windows, stairs, floors, or painting.

=== Treatments ===
Proper ventilation of the structure. The season and geographical location of the lighthouse will determine what type and how often air exchanges should take place within the lighthouse. Reduce moisture by repairing leaks around windows, doors, and the roof. One ventilation method is taking advantage of prevailing winds by installing louvers.

=== Security ===
Doors and windows should be repaired with care taken not to damage historic moldings and entry features of the lighthouse. Wooden or steel doors can be used.

=== Lantern ===
The lantern is the large round glass structure, that houses the lens, located at the top of the lighthouse. This structure is made out of multiple materials, primarily glass, wood, and iron.

Any conservation or restoration processes should keep in mind that the lantern, ventilation shafts, and lens should not be obstructed in any way. Any replacement glass must be rated for wind standards that are likely to occur at the top of the lighthouse.

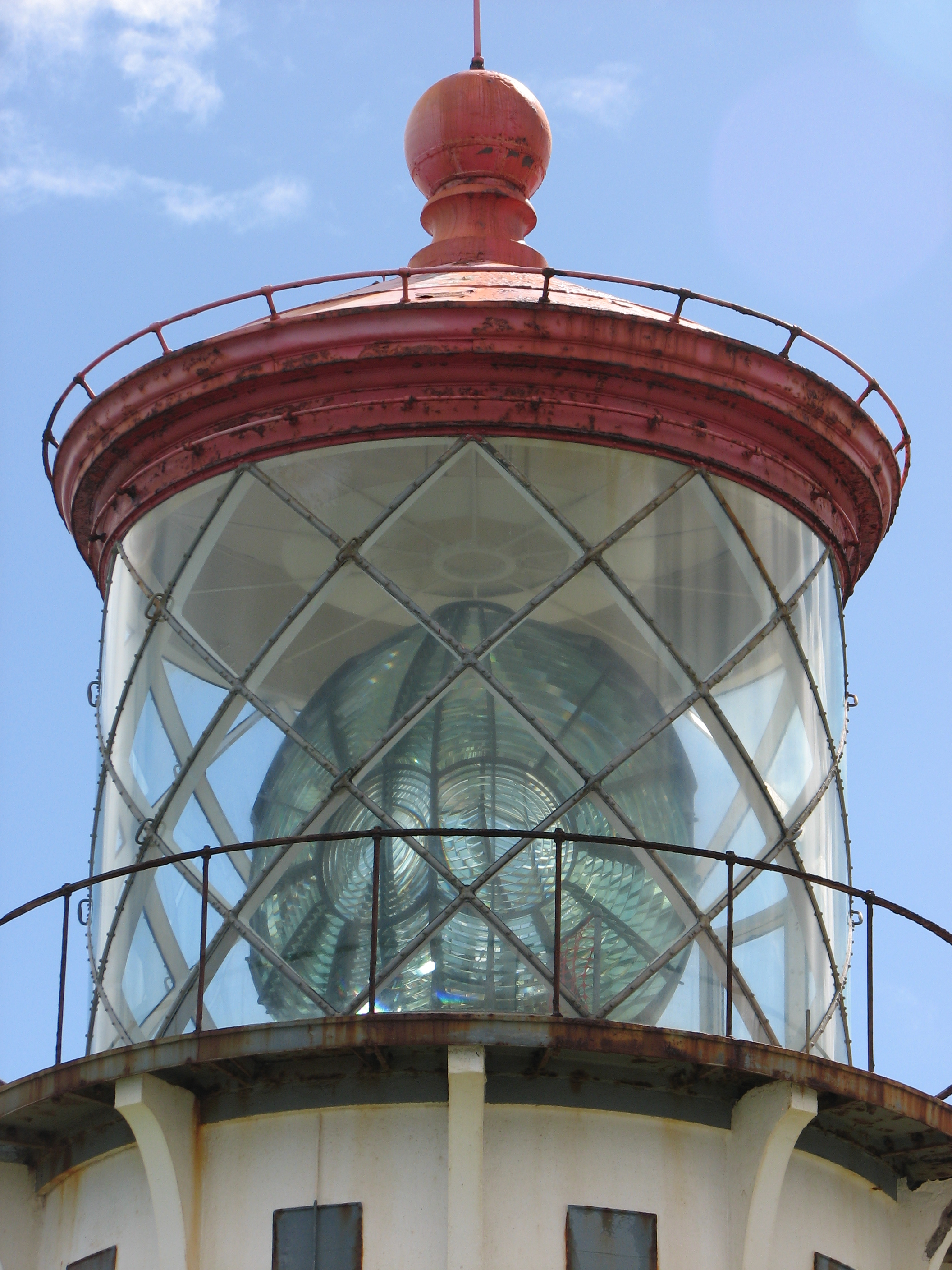
Lantern with a lens inside (Kīlauea Light)

==== Lens ====
The Fresnel lens was introduced for use in lighthouses around 1823. Generally, keeping the lens historically preserved, rather than restoration to period, will reduce stress on the lens and keep some of the lens's story intact (e.g. chips of the glass that are documented in historical light keeper's notes). It is important to consult a conservator before attempting any conservation on a lens. The glass that was used to make the lens is often brittle and may chip easily. Lens glass etches easily from contact with oils or dust.

To secure the prisms of the lens a compound of calcium carbonate, lead, and linseed oil, called litharge, was used. If deterioration of the litharge is found, it is likely that the prisms are not properly secured within the frame structure of the lens. If the litharge is white in color (lead carbonate) the material is mostly non-porous and may not easily be preserved, meaning that full litharge replacement might be necessary. If the litharge present is orange-red in color (lead-oxide), this substance tends to be more porous and may allow for stabilization.

Originally, the lens was "floated in a trough of mercury"; though this practice has been abandoned, mercury contamination may still exist in the area.

===== Cleaning a lens =====
Documentation of the prism normally begins with labeling all issues starting from the center prism, listed as number one, and then working outward sequentially. Identification should indicate whether it is an upper or lower prism. Prisms are checked for firm seating by gently tapping on the outside of the glass only. If there is any movement of the glass, conservators are normally called before any work is continued. If the glass is stable, the prisms will then be checked for particulate matter. If fine or non-abrasive particles are observed, a soft cotton cloth lightly wetted with distilled water may be used to gently clean the surface. It is also possible to use denatured alcohol mixed with water to clean the glass. The solution will vary from lens to lens as each has a different glass composition. A conservator should be called in if any clouding of the glass is found as this is a sign of glass deterioration.

In the past, a routine polishing of the brass that secures the lenses would take place. Polishing is an abrasive process that encourages loss of original material. In preventive conservation, the task of brass polishing should not take place. The patina that develops over time also helps create a protective barrier around the brass. The brass should be cleaned from dirt or dust using a vacuum or soft brush. Any residue polish from the past should be removed using a diluted detergent solution and a soft brush or cotton swab.

== Funding ==
The National Register of Historic Places has various grant programs for eligible lighthouses. Some lighthouses may also qualify for a state or federal historic rehabilitation tax credit.

The National Historic Lighthouse Preservation Act of 2000 allows lighthouses to be transferred at no cost to federal agencies, state and local governments, nonprofits, educational agencies, and community development organizations so long as they comply with the conditions standards and can financially care for the lighthouse.

The United States Lighthouse Society is a non-profit with resource materials available to the public. State Historic Preservation Offices have resources and information that may be used towards the preservation of lighthouses.

== Disaster planning ==
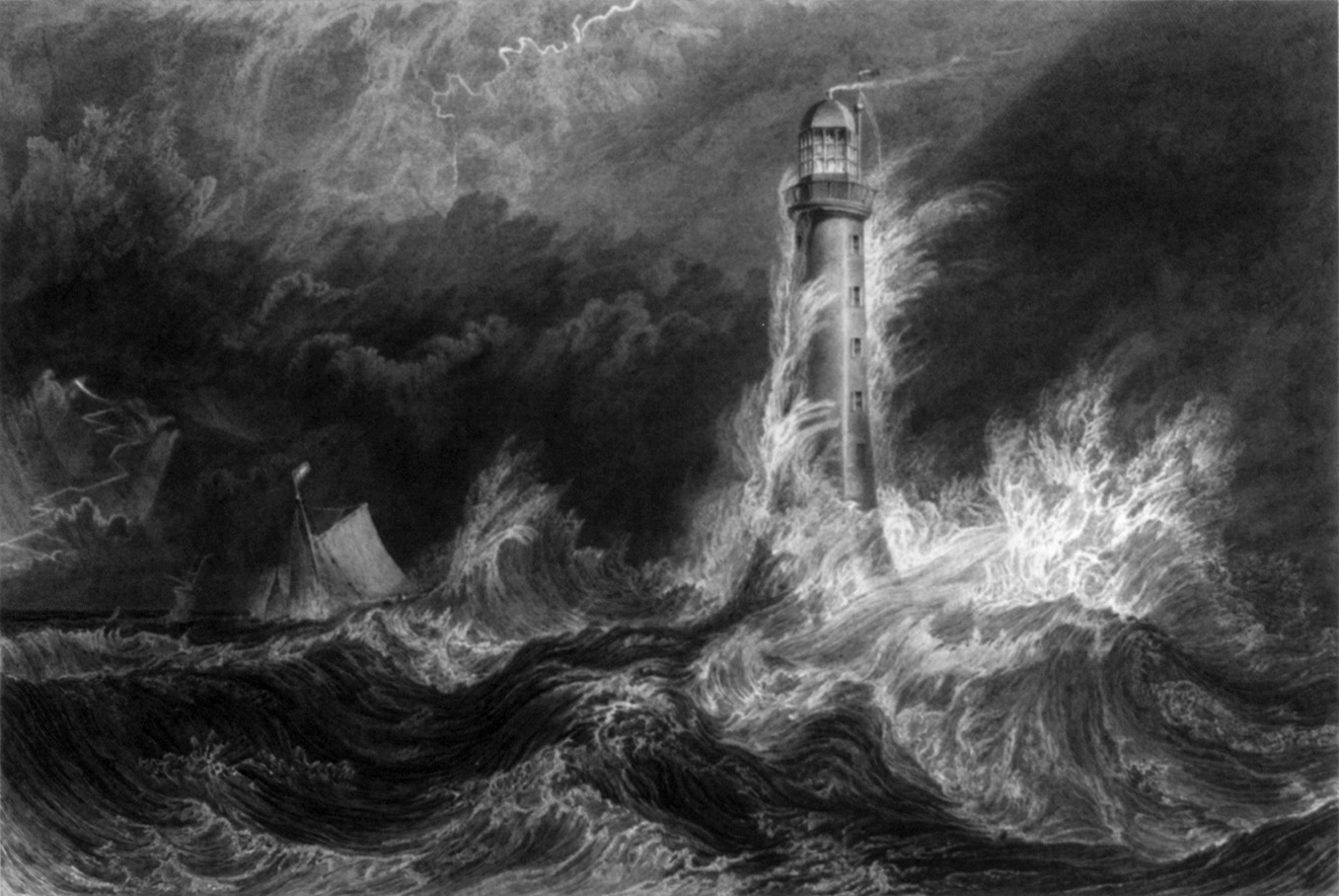
Bell Rock Lighthouse during a storm

Due to the different locations and building materials, lighthouses face different environmental elements and therefore need to plan different disasters. Lighthouses do often have well designed plans specified for the environmental risks in their area. Common risks include land erosion, landslides, hurricanes, flooding, and earthquake. Past disasters include being "swept away by tsunamis, destroyed by hurricanes, toppled by erosion, gutted by fire, even targeted by weapons of war."

Storms and hurricanes bring heavy rain, strong wind, rising surf, and large waves. These result in broken windows, flooding, structural damage to the buildings, erosion of the surrounding land, and more. Lighthouses are most vulnerable to hurricanes. They have been damaged or swept away by the surf.

Regardless of specific disaster risks, the same steps are taken: preparation, response, and recovery.

=== Preparation ===
Preparation includes a risk assessment. A risk assessment is performed to find vulnerabilities include evaluating the land in which the lighthouse sits, the materials used to build the lighthouse, and the type of storms or other natural disasters that occur in the area.

=== Response ===
Lighthouse keepers have a "people first" cardinal rule. If there is imminent danger, all visitors then staff will be evacuated before trying to protect the building and artifacts. If there is advanced warning, like a hurricane warning, the windows and other openings will be boarded up to block water. Records, inventory, and artifacts should be moved away from possible water damage locations. Wrap artifacts or displays for further protection against water damage.

=== Recovery ===
The first step in recovery is to attend anyone who was injured. Next the area is assessed for damage. The assessment includes touring the area and building for safety hazards, such as broken glass, down power lines, and mass erosion of land. Lastly, repairs begin. Repairs include filing insurance claims, removing debris and flood water, and repairing security systems. Collect artifacts to perform a condition report and place the artifacts in a safe location during building repairs. Reduce temperature and humidity to control mold growth. Seek professional conservators to assist in damaged historical components. Following the conservator's Cardinal Rule to "do no more harm" separate non-historical and historical materials and do the technical research regarding the required different approaches for different materials.

=== Moving a lighthouse ===
Strong winds and waves cause land erosion around lighthouses. Over extended periods of time, the promontories that lighthouses are normally built on can be eroded to the point where the safety of the lighthouse is impacted. In extreme cases, the lighthouse might need to be relocated to a new plot of land in order to preserve the structure. There are four major lighthouse moves that have taken place in the United States: Block Island Southeast Lighthouse, Cape Hatteras Lighthouse, Sankaty Head Lighthouse, and Gay Head Lighthouse.

== Case studies ==
=== Cape Hatteras Lighthouse – North Carolina ===
The Cape Hatteras Lighthouse of Buxton, North Carolina, originally constructed in 1870, was stabilized, restored, and relocated because erosion of the shoreline and deterioration threatened its stability. After extensive assessments precluded work on site that involved geotechnical investigation, masonry and stone restoration, material investigations, surveying, and the creation of historical metals to replicate what was necessary. The 4,800 ton lighthouse had to be moved 0.5 miles (0.8 km) to its new location.

=== St. Simons Island Lighthouse – Georgia ===
The U.S. Coast Guard’s Civil Engineering Unit is responsible for the maintenance and preservation of the St. Simons Island Lighthouse. One of their projects was the replacement of the panels in their third-order Fresnel lens, while also conserving existing lanterns considering the limited budget available. This incremental program would also become the model for preserving other lighthouse lanterns.

When assessing the lantern, the USCG CEU encountered deteriorated lantern glass due to poor ventilation and corrosion of metal surfaces because of high levels of moisture. Rust inhibiting coatings were applied to the cast-iron posts. Many historic parts, such as the fasteners, that were in good condition were extracted carefully in order to be reused.
