= List of Florida hurricanes (1900–1949) =

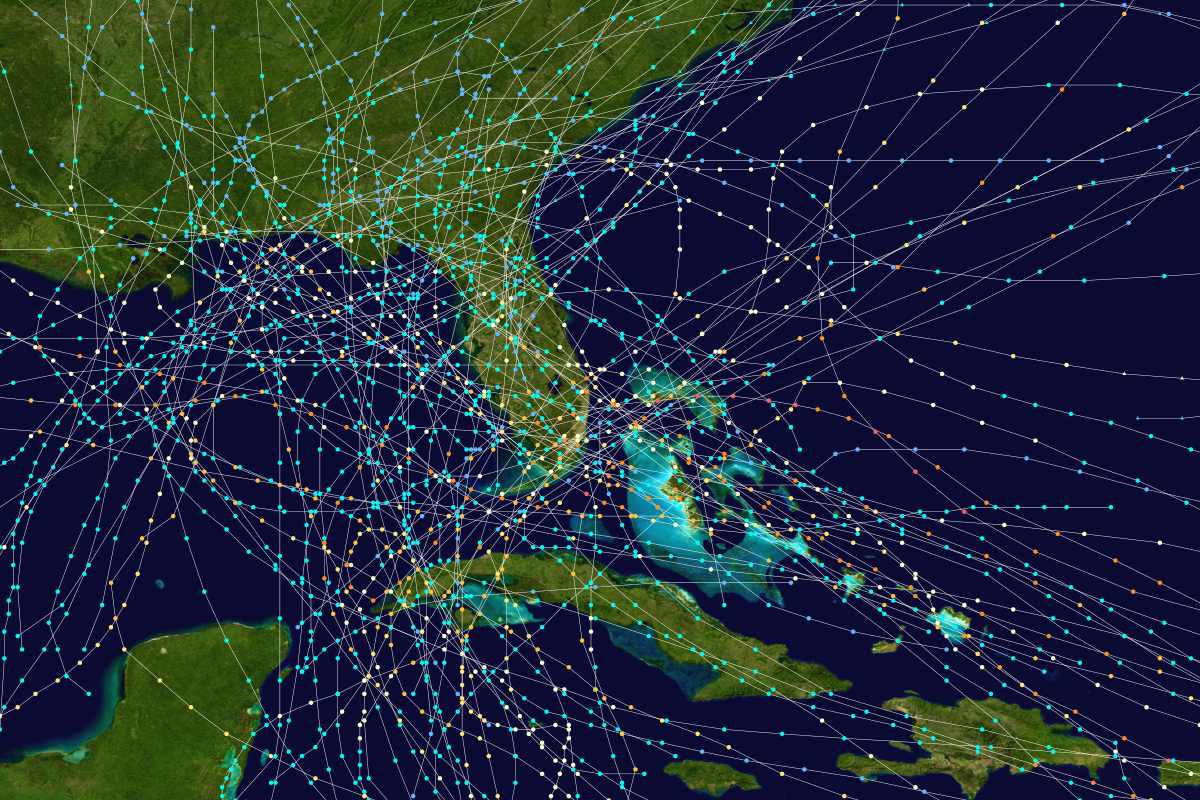
Tracks of hurricanes over Florida from 1900 to 1949

Between 1900 and 1949, 108 Atlantic hurricanes have affected the U.S. state of Florida. Collectively, tropical cyclones in Florida during the time period resulted in about $4 billion (2008 USD) in damage. Additionally, tropical cyclones in Florida were directly responsible for about 3,550 fatalities during the time period, most of which were from the 1928 Okeechobee Hurricane. The 1947 season was the year with the most tropical cyclones affecting the state, with a total of 6 systems. The 1905, 1908, 1913, 1927, 1931, 1942, and 1943 seasons were the only years during the time period in which a storm did not affect the Florida coast.

The strongest hurricane to hit the state during the time period was the 1935 Labor Day hurricane, which also bears the distinction of being the strongest recorded hurricane to strike the United States. Several other major hurricanes struck the state during the time period, including the 1926 Miami hurricane, the 1928 Okeechobee hurricane, and a cyclone each in 1945, 1947, 1948, and 1949. All of these storms made landfall as Category 4 hurricanes.

== 1900–1909 ==
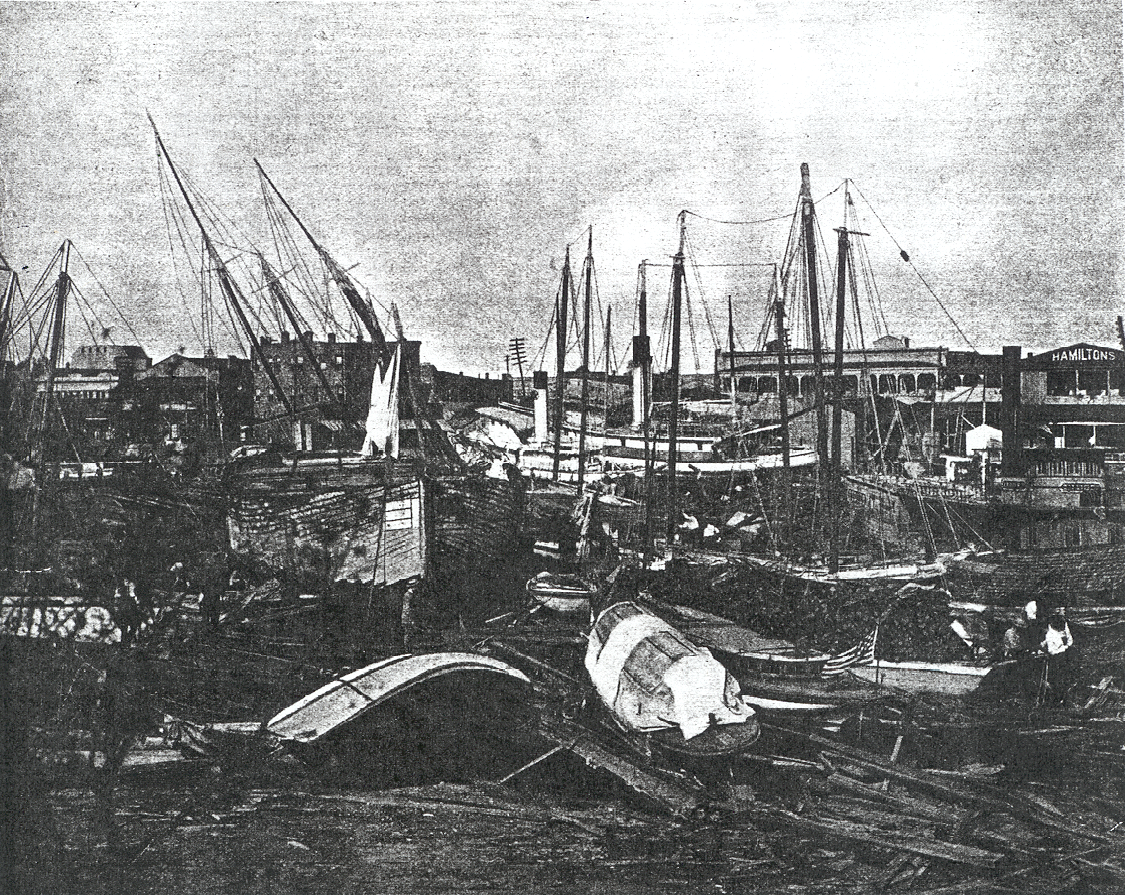
Shipping damage in Pensacola from 1906 hurricane

- September 5, 1900 – The Great Galveston hurricane passed over or just to the west of the western Florida Keys as a tropical storm, producing tropical storm force winds throughout the state. Prior warning kept nearly all ships in the state at port, and no damage was reported.
- October 12, 1900 – A tropical storm hits near Cedar Key, crosses the state, and exits near Jacksonville.
- June 13, 1901 – The first storm of the season hit just east of Apalachicola.
- August 10, 1901 – A tropical storm moved ashore near Fort Lauderdale.
- September 17, 1901 – Pensacola was struck by a tropical storm which produced heavy rainfall along its path.
- September 28, 1901 – A tropical storm made landfall near Apalachicola, though its effects, if any, are unknown.
- June 14, 1902 – The first storm of the season hit near Tallahassee, with no severe impact reported.
- October 10, 1902 – Pensacola was struck by a tropical storm; its impact is unknown.
- September 11, 1903 – A hurricane moved ashore near Fort Lauderdale, and after emerging into the Gulf of Mexico it hit near Panama City. Moderate damage to structures and crops was reported across the state, with monetary damage totaling about $650,000 (1903 USD, $15.5 million 2008 USD), and nine lives were lost when a British schooner capsized near Delray Beach.
- October 17, 1904 – Light structural damage and locally heavy crop losses resulted from a hurricane hitting south of Miami before executing a counter-clockwise loop and striking again near Chokoloskee. Offshore, seven lives were lost after a schooner foundered.
- November 3, 1904 – The fifth storm of the season made landfall as a tropical storm near Pensacola.
- June 12, 1906 – A tropical storm moved ashore near Panama City; no severe impact was reported.
- June 17, 1906 – A hurricane produced locally strong winds as it crossed the extreme southeastern portion of the state.
- September 27, 1906 – Southern Mississippi was struck by a moderate hurricane, with strong winds and waves affecting much of the Florida west coast. It is considered among the worst cyclones on record at Pensacola, where high tides caused severe shipping damage. The hurricane resulted in 32 casualties and $3.4 million in damage (1906 USD, $81 million 2008 USD).

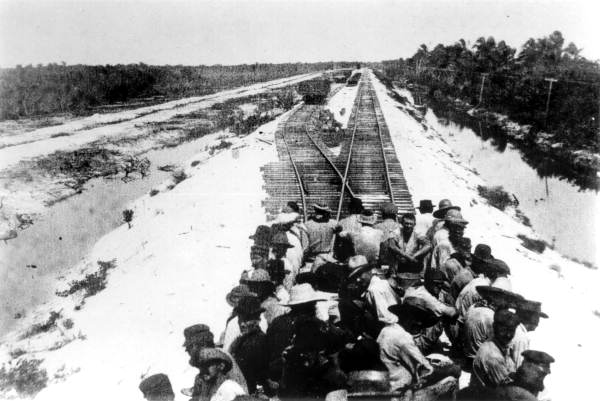
Hundreds of workers on the Florida East Coast Railway are lost when a hurricane moves through the region in 1906

- October 18, 1906 – The 1906 Florida Keys hurricane moved through the Florida Keys before crossing the extreme southeastern portion of the state. High seas destroyed hundreds of vessels in the region, including many houseboats of the hundreds of workers on the Florida East Coast Railway construction through the Keys; a total of 135 workers were killed. On the mainland, the cyclone resulted in severe crop damage and the destruction of many houses in the Miami area, and across the state the hurricane caused 141 fatalities and over $360,000 in damage (1906 USD, $8.6 million 2008 USD). The storm tracked northward and ultimately made a second landfall as a tropical storm near Jacksonville.
- June 28, 1907 – The first storm of the season moved ashore near Panama City, with no severe impact reported.
- September 18, 1907 – A tropical depression crossed the southern portion of the state; no damage or fatalities were reported.
- September 28, 1907 – Strong winds and heavy rainfall occurred in association with a tropical storm striking the Florida Panhandle.
- June 28, 1909 – Fort Lauderdale was struck by a tropical storm, which produced light winds and otherwise little impact.
- August 29, 1909 – A weak tropical storm crossed the eastern portion of the state, resulting in minor impact.
- September 20, 1909 – The western Florida Panhandle received minor damage, mostly to shipping, from a hurricane hitting southern Louisiana.
- September 25, 1909 – A tropical depression crossed the southern portion of the state, with no severe impact reported.
- October 11, 1909 – The 1909 Florida Keys hurricane struck Marathon as major hurricane and brushed the rest of the island chain, destroying about 400 buildings and 300 boats; damage is estimated at $1 million (1909 USD, $24 million 2008 USD). Thirteen fatalities were reported throughout the state.

== 1910–1919 ==
- October 17, 1910 – The Florida Keys were brushed by a major hurricane, which struck the mainland near Fort Myers as a strong Category 2 hurricane a day later. High tides and heavy rainfall caused flooding in the keys, though damage was fairly minor. On the mainland, the hurricane destroyed 10% of the state's citrus crop, and caused moderate damage elsewhere. Across the state, the hurricane resulted in around $360,000 (1910 USD, $8.3 million 2008 USD) and eleven fatalities.
- August 4, 1911 – A tropical depression developed near the Alabama/Florida border, and produced light rainfall and winds across the northern portion of the state.
- August 11, 1911 – Pensacola experienced 80 mph (130 km/h) winds and 4.48 inches (114 mm) of precipitation in association with a hurricane hitting southern Alabama; damage was fairly minor.
- August 28, 1911 – A hurricane made landfall in extreme southern South Carolina, with its large circulation producing moderate precipitation in northeastern Florida.
- November 1, 1911 – Shortly after becoming an extratropical cyclone, a tropical storm hit near Cedar Key and caused unsettled conditions across the state for several days.
- June 13, 1912 – The first storm of the season hit southern Louisiana, which produced about three inches (75 mm) of rainfall in Pensacola.
- September 10, 1912 – A tropical depression formed in the Gulf of Mexico and later moved ashore in extreme southeastern Mississippi; the developing disturbance produced heavy rainfall, including 23.2 inches (588 mm) at Cedar Key, and while making landfall it caused minor shipping and coastal damage in Pensacola.
- September 17, 1914 – The only tropical storm of the season struck near the Georgia/Florida border, producing moderate rainfall and above normal tides.
- August 1, 1915 – A minimal hurricane hit near Daytona Beach, dropping moderate precipitation and causing some damage.
- September 4, 1915 – Apalachicola was struck by a hurricane that caused above normal tides and locally moderate damage.
- September 29, 1915 – A hurricane produced above normal tides in Pensacola.
- May 14, 1916 – A minimal tropical storm crossed the state.
- July 5, 1916 – High tides and about $1 million (1916 USD, $20 million 2008 USD) in the Pensacola area were caused by a hurricane making landfall in southern Mississippi.
- August 24, 1916 – A tropical storm moved across the southeastern portion of the state.
- September 13, 1916 – A low-pressure area moved ashore near Cape Canaveral, with the worst of its effects remaining offshore. Originally, it was classified as a tropical storm.
- October 18, 1916 – Pensacola was struck by a strong Category 2 hurricane, recording peak wind gusts of around 120 mph (195 km/h). Despite the intensity, overall damage was small due to its fast track. The hurricane caused one drowning in Pensacola.
- November 15, 1916 – The remnants of a tropical storm brushed the Florida Keys, but failed to produce significant damage in the state.
- September 29, 1917 – A major hurricane made landfall near Pensacola on Ft. Walton Beach with recorded sustained winds of 103 mph (166 km/h) and gusts to 125 mph (200 km/h); the passage of the cyclone resulted in five fatalities and about $170,000 in damage (1917 USD, $2.9 million 2008 USD).
- June 22, 1918 – A tropical depression crossed the southern portion of the state.
- July 4, 1919 – The first storm of the season hit just west of Pensacola, with no severe impact reported.
- September 9, 1919 – The 1919 Florida Keys hurricane passed about 50 miles (80 km) south of Key West, producing strong winds and heavy rainfall reaching an estimated peak of 13.4 inches (340 mm). Shipping losses were heavy, and damage in the Florida Keys is estimated at $2 million (1919 USD, $25 million 2008 USD).
- September 30, 1919 – Moving ashore along the Georgia coastline, a tropical storm brushed northeastern Florida.

== 1920–1929 ==
- September 22, 1920 – A hurricane struck southern Louisiana, with its outer rainbands producing trace precipitation and gale-force winds in the western Florida Panhandle.
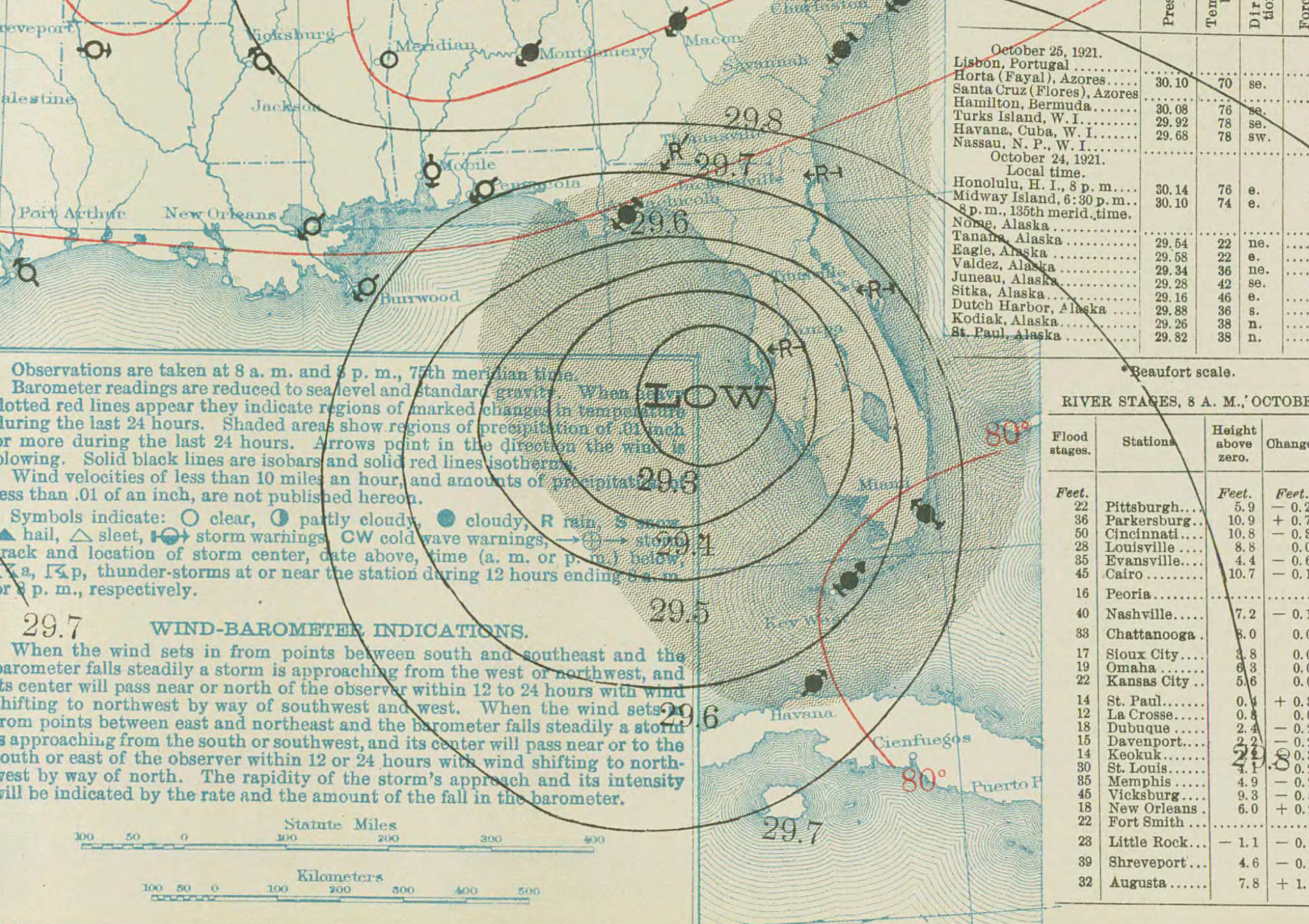
  Weather map of the 1921 hurricane making landfall on October 25 in the Tampa Bay Area
- September 30, 1920 – The final storm of season made landfall near Cedar Key, bringing rainfall and gusty winds along much of the western coast. It caused coastal flooding and crop damage, and in St. Petersburg the storm resulted in an indirect fatality.
- October 25, 1921 – The 1921 Tampa Bay hurricane struck Tarpon Springs, producing moderate winds, a storm tide reaching 10.5 feet (3.2 m), and heavy rainfall peaking at 11.73 inches (298 mm) at St. Leo. About five people were killed as a result of the storm, and damage is estimated at $5 million (1921 USD, $60 million 2008 USD).
- October 17, 1922 – A weak tropical storm moved ashore just west of the Florida/Alabama; there were no reports of serious damage.
- October 16, 1923 – Winds reached 64 mph (103 km/h) at Pensacola in association with a hurricane hitting Louisiana, which caused shipping damage in northwestern Florida.
- October 17, 1923 – A tropical storm made landfall in southern Mississippi, with winds reaching 56 mph (90 km/h) in Pensacola.
- September 15, 1924 – A minimal hurricane moved ashore near Panama City, producing winds of up to 80 mph (130 km/h) but little damage.
- October 21, 1924 – Moderate crop and flooding damage occurred after a hurricane struck the southwestern portion of the state.
- December 1, 1925 – Moving ashore south of Tampa later than any other United States tropical cyclone on record, a tropical storm crossed the central portion of the state, dropping 14.1 inches (357 mm) of rain at Miami and heavily eroding northeastern beaches; damage is estimated at $3 million (1925 USD, $40.8 million 2016 USD). The storm killed 16 people in the state.
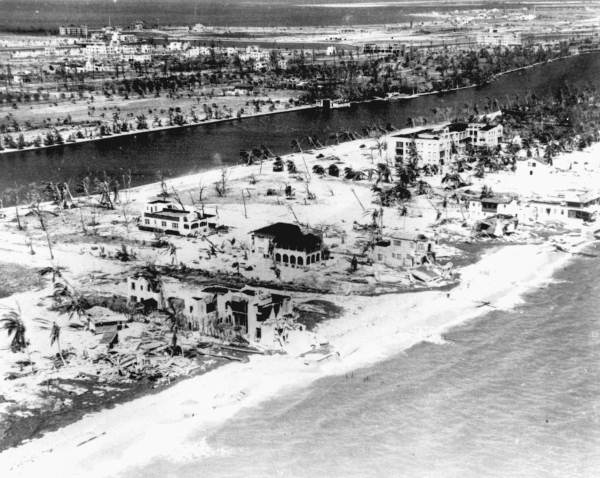
  Damage in Miami from 1926 hurricane
- July 27, 1926 – A moderate hurricane moved ashore near Cocoa Beach, killing one person and causing about $3 million in damage (1926 USD, $36.5 million 2008 USD), primarily from fruit losses.
- September 17, 1926 – The Florida Keys were brushed by a slow-moving and weak tropical storm.
- September 18, 1926 – The 1926 Miami hurricane made landfall as a Category 4 hurricane near Miami. A powerful storm surge in excess of 11 feet (3.3 m) flooded Miami Beach, while strong winds recorded at up to 128 mph (206 km/h) caused severe damage across the region. About 4,725 houses were destroyed with another 9,100 damaged, leaving about 25,000 people homeless, and damage in the Miami area is estimated at $76 million (1926 USD, $926 million 2008 USD). Due to uncertainties, such as the inclusion of non-white fatalities, the National Weather Service reported the death toll in the state at 372 casualties, with a note that the total could be several dozen greater. Damage is heavy in Pensacola from the final landfall of the hurricane.
- October 21, 1926 – Passing a short distance east of the Florida Keys, a hurricane caused light damage and power outages near the coastline; one person was killed after being struck by flying debris.

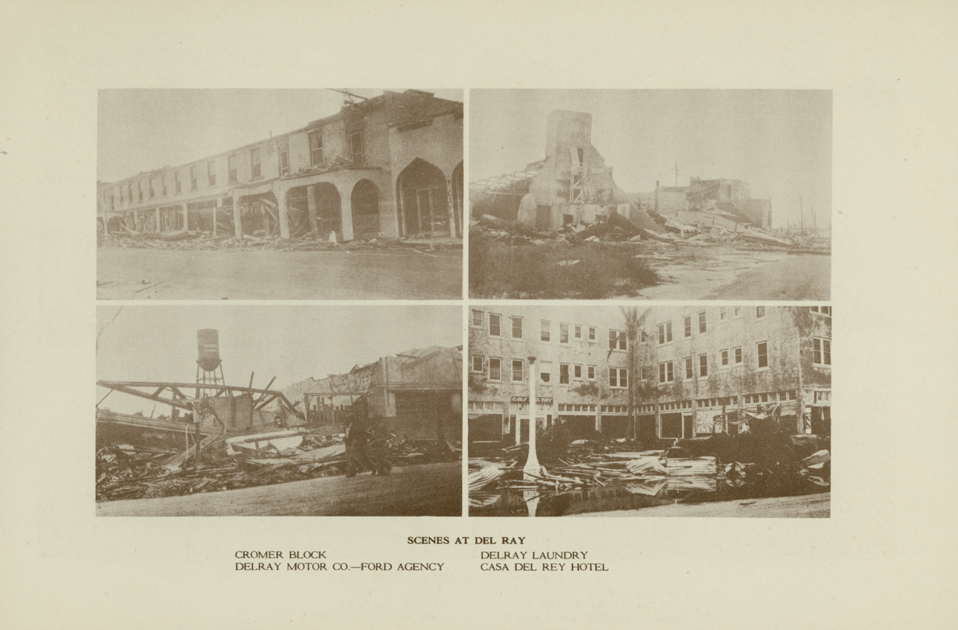
Destruction in Delray Beach from 1928 Okeechobee hurricane

- August 7, 1928 – The first hurricane of the season moved ashore near Fort Pierce, causing moderate damage to highways, crops, and telephone lines; damage is estimated at $5 million (1928 USD, $63 million 2008 USD), and there were four reported casualties near Jupiter.
- August 14, 1928 – A tropical storm struck near Apalachicola after crossing the Florida Keys, causing minor damage.
- September 17, 1928 – The 1928 Okeechobee hurricane made landfall between Jupiter and Boca Raton as the equivalent of a Category 4 hurricane, producing a storm surge of 10 feet and waves of up to 20 feet which caused severe damage near the coast. As it crossed the state, strongly northerly winds piled up water from Lake Okeechobee at its southern end, which surpassed the levee and flooded a 450 mi^{2} (1165 km^{2}) area up to 12 feet (3.6 m) deep. The flooding, which lasted for several weeks, caused severe loss of human and animal life; damage in the state is estimated at $25 million (1928 USD, $315 million 2008 USD). The death toll is unknown, but is estimated at over 2,500 fatalities, making the cyclone the third deadliest hurricane in American history.
- September 28, 1929 – A major hurricane crossed the southern portion of the state, and two days later hit near Apalachicola. The cyclone produced several tornadoes in the Miami area, and despite its ferocity overall damage was minor; three people were killed in association with the storm.

== 1930–1939 ==
- August 9, 1930 – The second tropical storm of the season crossed through the center of the state; as it previously crossed the mountainous terrain of the Greater Antilles, the storm was severely weakened, and caused no reported serious damage in the state.
- August 30, 1932 – A tropical storm crossed the southern portion of the state, causing some minor structural damage and minor power outages.
- September 15, 1932 – A weak tropical storm produced light winds but no reported damage after hitting near Steinhatchee.
- July 30, 1933 – Moving ashore near Hobe Sound, a minimal hurricane caused minor damage to crops, roofs, and signs.
- August 20, 1933 – The remnants of the seventh tropical storm of the season hit near Tallahassee, resulting in minor damage.
- September 1, 1933 – Passing to the south of Key West, a moderate hurricane produced light winds and minor damage in the Florida Keys.
- September 4, 1933 – A Category 3 hurricane struck Jupiter, with its strong winds destroying 4 million boxes of citrus fruit. The passage of the hurricane resulted in $2 million in damage (1933 USD, $33 million 2008 USD) and two deaths.
- October 5, 1933 – Paralleling the Florida Keys before accelerating northeastward, a major hurricane dropped heavy rainfall and spawned a tornado in Miami, resulting in minor damage and two injuries.
- July 22, 1934 – Moving southwestward into the northeastern portion of the state, a tropical depression produced gusty winds across the northern portion of the state.
- October 6, 1934 – The eleventh tropical storm of the season hit near Pensacola, and caused no marked damage along its path.

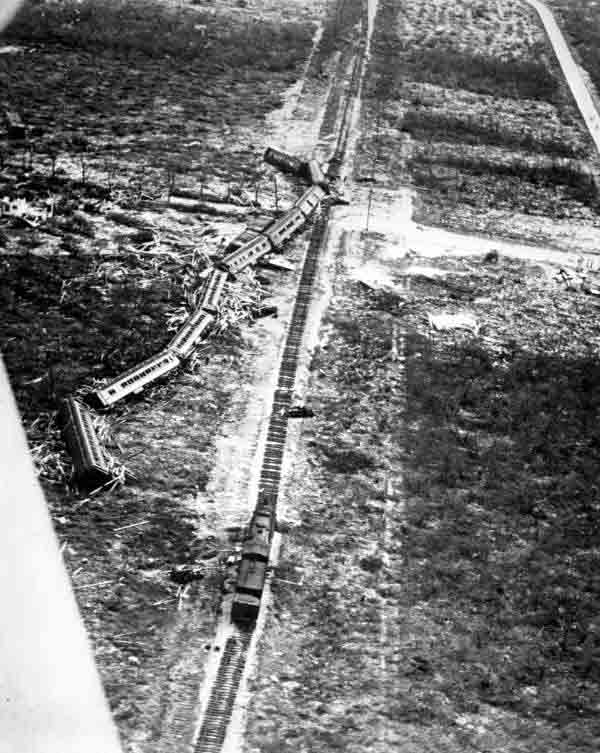
Relief train derailed by storm surge during the 1935 hurricane near Islamorada

- September 3, 1935 – The 1935 Labor Day hurricane struck Craig Key with sustained winds estimated at 185 mph (300 km/h) and gusts exceeding 200 mph (320 km/h), one of only four hurricanes to hit the United States at Category 5 status on the Saffir–Simpson scale. A pressure of 892 mbar (26.35 inHg) was recorded at landfall, which at the time was the lowest reported pressure in the Western Hemisphere. A small but violent cyclone, the hurricane resulted in almost complete destruction over a distance of about 30 miles (48 km), much of it caused from its powerful storm surge. One estimate by the Red Cross indicates 409 fatalities in the Florida Keys, many of whom at war veteran work relief camps. It later hit near Cedar Key as a major hurricane, where it caused further damage and flooding.
- September 28, 1935 – Passing a short distance of Miami, a major hurricane produced moderate winds, but there was little damage along the coast.
- November 4, 1935 – A cyclone known as the Yankee hurricane moved ashore near Miami after developing near Bermuda, and produced winds of up to 94 mph (151 km/h). The late-season storm resulted in a monetary damage total of $5.5 million (1935 USD, $87 million 2008 USD) across the southern portion of the state, much of it from roof damage. Five deaths were reported in the state, with an additional 115 injuries.
- June 15, 1936 – The first storm of the season hit about 20 miles (32 km) south of Fort Myers, and while crossing the state dropped up to 15 inches (380 mm) of precipitation. The passage of the storm resulted in some flooding damage, as well as three indirect deaths from a plane crash.
- July 29, 1936 – After moving across the southern portion of the state, a moderate hurricane moved ashore near Pensacola, causing fairly minor damage, largely limited to its second landfall. Four fatalities were indirectly related to the hurricane when a boat capsized in the Gulf of Mexico.
- August 21, 1936 – A weak tropical storm made landfall near Daytona Beach; it produced heavy rainfall but resulted in minimal damage.
- July 30, 1937 – The first storm of the season hit near Clearwater, dropping moderate precipitation which reached 8.88 inches (225 mm) near its landfall location; minor damage was reported.
- August 30, 1937 – Daytona Beach was struck by a tropical storm, and across the state it caused considerable minor damage. On the Florida Panhandle, its accompanying rainfall destroyed several bridges.
- September 21, 1937 – A weak tropical storm hit near the mouth of the Steinhatchee River, which resulted in minor damage and a few injuries from its accompanying heavy rainfall.
- September 17, 1938 – The 1938 New England hurricane was initially—but erroneously—forecast to strike Florida, with storm warnings issued from Jacksonville through Key West.
- June 16, 1939 – The first storm of the season hit near Mobile, Alabama, with its outer rainbands dropping heavy rainfall across Florida and killing one child in Wauchula.
- August 11, 1939 – A minimal hurricane hit Fort Pierce and later on the Panhandle near Apalachicola. The storm caused minor damage, limited to uprooted trees and power outages, and killed one after rough waves capsized a boat at Cedar Key.
- September 26, 1939 – 49 mph (79 km/h) wind gusts and no damage were reported in occurrence with a weak tropical storm hitting Louisiana.

== 1940–1949 ==
- August 2, 1940 – Light winds were reported in association with a tropical storm moving across the northern portion of the state; no damage was reported.
- October 6, 1941 – A hurricane hit near Miami with gusts reaching 123 mph (198 km/h) and later moved ashore along the Florida Panhandle. Its accompanying 4.1 foot (1.25 m) storm surge caused coastal flooding in the southeast portion of the state. The hurricane drowned five people in Carrabelle, and damage across the state totaled about $675,000 (1941 USD, $9.9 million 2008 USD).
- October 20, 1941 – The final storm of the season moved ashore near Cedar Key after previously passing through the Florida Keys. It dropped heavy rainfall which caused some flooding damage.
- September 10, 1944 – A tropical storm hit southeastern Louisiana, with the eastern portion of its circulation causing slight crop damage and gale-force winds across the western Florida Panhandle.
- October 19, 1944 – The final hurricane of the season struck near Sarasota with winds of 105 mph (170 km/h). Its winds severely damaged the citrus crop, which accounts for about 80% of the damage total of $63 million (1944 USD, $772 million 2008 USD) in the state. A total of 18 people were killed in the state.
- June 24, 1945 – An early-season hurricane moved inland between Brooksville and Dunnellon, and spawned one tornado near Melbourne. No lives were lost, which is credited due to the evacuation of thousands from the coast. Damage in the state was minor.
- September 4, 1945 – A weak tropical storm brushed the western coastline before turning to the northwest, and caused minor damage to boats in Miami.
- September 15, 1945 – The ninth storm of the season, a Category 4 hurricane, struck Key Largo with wind gusts reaching 150 mph (240 km/h). The winds ignited a fire at three hangars at the Richmond Naval Air Station, which destroyed 25 blimps, 366 planes, and 150 automobiles. Across the state, the passage of the hurricane resulted in 1,632 destroyed houses, with an additional 5,372 damaged. Damage amounted to $54 million (1945 USD, $647 million 2008 USD), of which nearly half occurred at the Richmond Air Station. Four people were killed in the state, with an additional 43 injured.
- October 8, 1946 – Rapidly weakening from peak, the fifth storm of the season hit the Tampa Bay area as a minimal hurricane, this makes this the last hurricane to directly hit the Tampa Bay area to date. The hurricane caused moderate crop damage in the western portion of the state, with its storm surge resulting in additional coastal damage. Monetary damage across the state totaled about $5.2 million (1946 USD, $57.5 million 2008 USD).
- November 1, 1946 – The last storm of the season moved ashore near Palm Beach as a minimal tropical storm; inland, it dropped heavy rainfall which caused millions of dollars in crop damage.

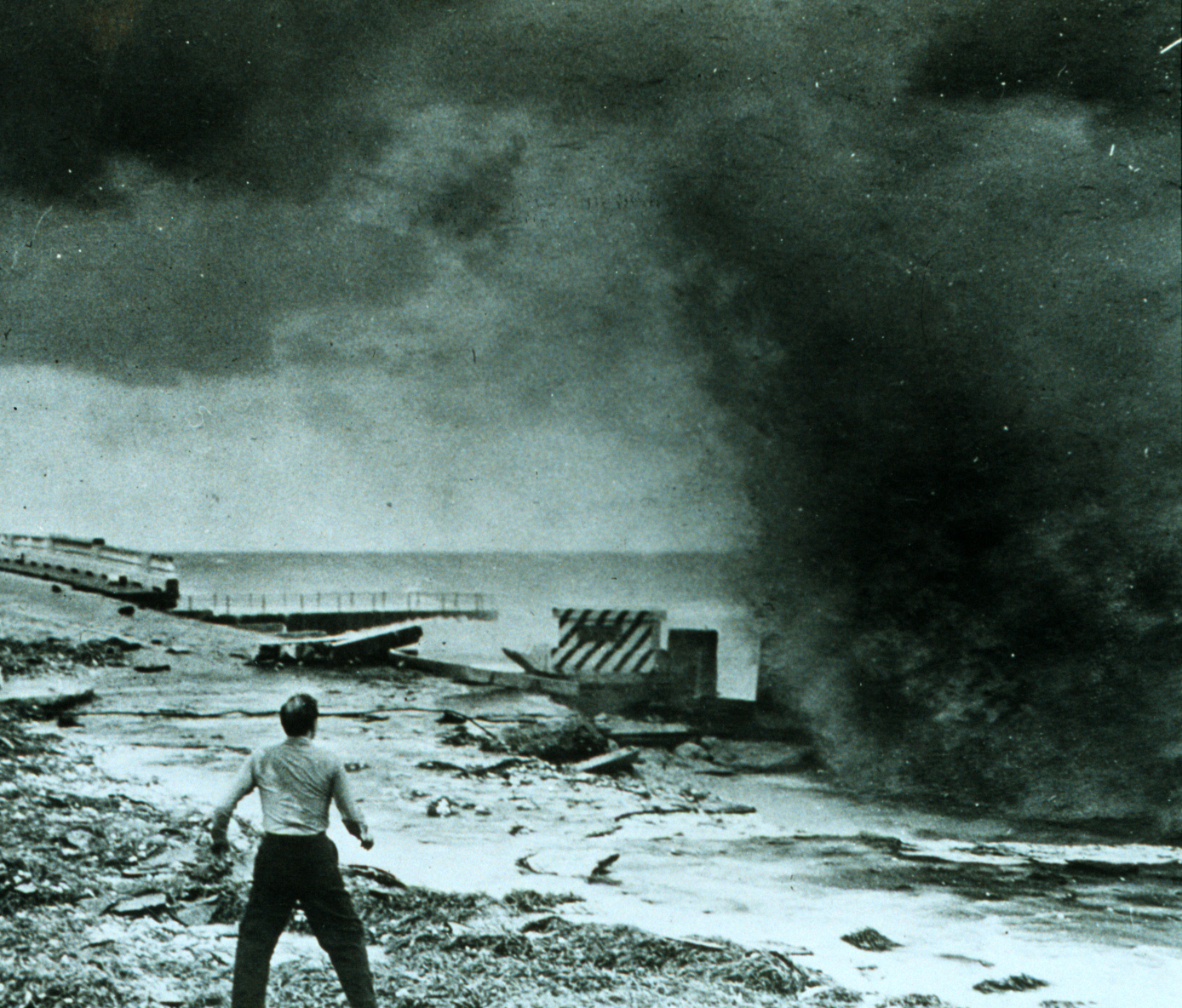
Surf from 1947 Fort Lauderdale hurricane

- August 18, 1947 – Winds gusts reached 45 mph (70 km/h) along the Florida Keys in association with a developing tropical storm.
- September 8, 1947 – A weak tropical storm moved ashore in Mississippi, with its outer rainbands producing winds of 51 mph at Pensacola.
- September 17, 1947 – The 1947 Fort Lauderdale hurricane struck the southeastern portion of the state with wind gusts of at least 155 mph (250 km/h); sustained winds of over 100 mph (160 km/h) occurred along 70 miles (120 km) of the eastern coastline. The hurricane produced heavy rainfall, which caused damaging flooding along crop fields. Heavy damage was also reported from Fort Myers to Sarasota, and statewide damage from the hurricane totaled about $31 million (1947 USD, $300 million 2008 USD). The hurricane caused 11 direct fatalities in the state, and was indirectly responsible for six more.
- September 23, 1947 – The sixth storm of the season hit near Yankeetown, dropping moderate rainfall which caused further flooding across the southern portion of the state. Nine tornadoes were spawned by the storm, which collectively destroyed three houses and damage dozens of houses.
- October 7, 1947 – A tropical storm hit near the Florida/Georgia border, and after turning southwestward into the Gulf of Mexico looped to the northeast through the Florida Panhandle. The storm causes high tides and beach erosion along the eastern coastline.
- October 12, 1947 – A hurricane moved across the southern portion of the state and dropped up to 13 inches (330 mm) of rainfall; the rainfall caused further flooding damage which ended an unusually wet season in the state. Wind damage was minor.
- July 9, 1948 – The second storm of the season hit near Destin. Some low-lying areas were flooded from heavy rainfall, but damage was minor.
- September 4, 1948 – A hurricane moved ashore along southern Louisiana, with its high tides extending eastward and reaching 3.4 feet at Pensacola. Damage was minor along the Florida Panhandle.
- September 21, 1948 – The Florida Keys were struck by a hurricane which produced wind gusts of over 122 mph (196 km/h). It dropped moderate to heavy rainfall across the southern portion of the state, peaking at 11 inches (280 mm) in Miami, and caused considerable flooding. Across the state, the hurricane severely damaged 1,161 homes and destroyed 39 others, with damage totaling $12 million (1948 USD, $107 million 2008 USD). Three people were killed, with another 45 hospitalized.
- October 5, 1948 – The fifth hurricane of the season hit the Florida Keys and brushed the southern portion of the state with winds of over 100 mph (160 km/h). The storm spawned three tornadoes, one of which destroyed 25 houses in Pompano Beach. 678 homes were destroyed or severely damaged, and damage across the state totaled $5.5 million (1948 USD, $49 million 2008 USD). The hurricane injured 42, though no deaths were reported in the state.
- August 26, 1949 – A Category 4 hurricane struck Lake Worth with wind gusts of over 153 mph (246 km/h). The winds severely damaged crops across its path, with the avocado and grapefruit crops sustaining heavy losses. Many houses along its path were damaged, as well, and monetary damage in the state totaled $45 million (1949 USD, $408 million 2008 USD). Additionally, four people were killed in the state, though it is unknown if all are directly related to the hurricane.

== Monthly statistics ==
Number of recorded storms affecting Florida
Month	Number of storms
May	2
June	10
July	9
August	18
September	40
October	23
November	5
December	1

== Deadly storms ==
The following is a list of hurricanes with known deaths in the state.

Name	Year	Number of deaths
Okeechobee	1928	~2,500
Labor Day	1935	409
Miami	1926	372
Florida Keys	1906	141
Unnamed	1906	32
Cuba–Florida	1944	18
Florida Keys	1909	13
Cuba	1910	11
Fort Lauderdale	1947	11
Florida	1903	9
Unnamed	1904	7 (offshore)
Nueva Gerona	1917	5
Tampa Bay	1921	5
Yankee	1935	5
Florida	1941	5
Fort Pierce	1928	4
Homestead	1945	4
Florida	1949	4
Bahamas	1929	3
Florida	1948	3
Treasure Coast	1933	2
Pensacola	1916	1
Nassau	1926	1
Unnamed	1939	1
Unnamed	1936	0 (4 indirect)
Unnamed	1936	0 (3 indirect)

== See also ==
- List of Florida hurricanes
