= List of Category 4 Atlantic hurricanes =

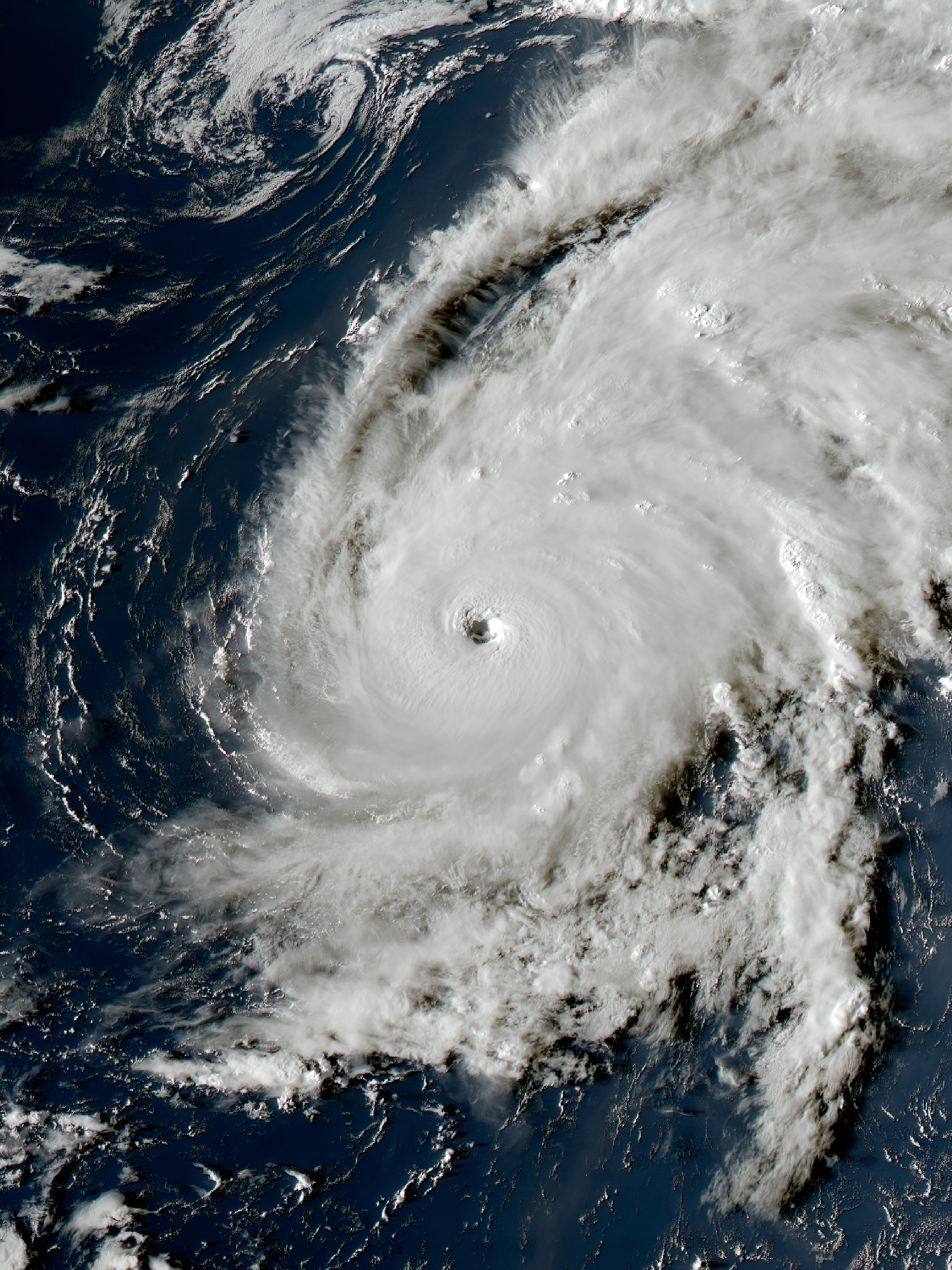
Hurricane Gabrielle at peak intensity east of Bermuda on September 22, 2025. It is the most recent hurricane of this strength as of September 2025

A Category 4 Atlantic hurricane is a tropical cyclone that reaches Category 4 intensity on the Saffir–Simpson scale. Category 4 hurricanes that later attained Category 5 strength are not included in this list. The Atlantic basin includes the open waters of the Atlantic Ocean, the Caribbean Sea and the Gulf of Mexico. Category 4 is the second-highest hurricane classification category on the Saffir–Simpson Hurricane Scale, and storms that are of this intensity maintain maximum sustained winds of 113–136 knots (130–156 mph, 209–251 km/h). Based on the Atlantic hurricane database, 143 hurricanes have attained Category 4 hurricane status since 1851, the start of modern meteorological record keeping.

== Statistics ==
=== Wind, damage, and storm surge statistics ===
Category 4 hurricanes have maximum sustained winds of 113–136 knots (130–156 mph, 209–251 km/h). "Sustained winds" refers to the average wind speed observed over one minute at a height of 10 meters (33 ft) above ground. Gusts can be up to 30% higher than the sustained winds. Mobile homes and other buildings without fixed structures can be completely destroyed, and the lower floors of sturdier structures usually sustain major damage. In addition to the winds, the cyclones generally produce a storm surge of 13–18 feet (4–5.5 m) above normal, potentially causing major beach erosion. Heavy, irreparable damage and/or near complete destruction of gas station canopies and other wide span overhang type structures are also very common, and mobile and manufactured homes are often completely destroyed. Low-level terrain may be flooded well inland, as well. In addition, Category 4 hurricanes are often Cape Verde-type hurricanes. Cape Verde hurricanes are usually the strongest, and their track sometimes points them towards the United States, or other land.

=== History of Category 4 Atlantic hurricanes ===
The number of Category 4 and 5 hurricanes appears to have nearly doubled in occurrence from 1970 to 2004. It is possible that the increase in Atlantic tropical storm and hurricane frequency is primarily due to improved monitoring.

Due to growing population in major coastal cities, many areas have become more vulnerable to strong hurricanes, especially categories 4 and 5.

== Meteorological measurements ==
All of the storms listed in this analysis are listed in chronological order, but they also list the minimum central pressure and maximum sustained winds. Each of these meteorological readings are taken using a specific meteorological instrument. For modern storms, the minimum pressure measurements are taken by reconnaissance aircraft using dropsondes, or by determining it from satellite imagery using the Dvorak technique. For older storms, pressures are often incomplete, typically being provided by ship-reports or land-observations. None of these methods can provide constant pressure measurements; thus it is possible the only measurement occurred when the cyclone was at a lesser strength. Sustained winds are taken using an Anemometer at 10 meters (33 ft) above the ground.

== Climatology ==
A total of 94 hurricanes in the Atlantic Ocean Basin, including the Gulf of Mexico and the Caribbean, have reached Category 4 status as their peak intensity. (Note that Category 4 storms that intensified later to Category 5 status are not included in this analysis.)

Most Category 4 hurricanes occur during September, with 51 storms occurring in that month. This coincides with the average peak of the Atlantic hurricane season, which occurs on September 10. Most Category 4 hurricanes develop in the warm waters of the Gulf of Mexico and the Caribbean Sea. Several Category 4 hurricanes are Cape Verde-type hurricanes. There have been no Category 4 hurricanes to form in either May or December, or in any other month outside the traditional bounds of the Atlantic hurricane season.

== Systems ==
=== 1851–1949 ===
Name	Duration	Peak intensity		Areas affected	Damage (USD)	Deaths	Refs
Name	Duration	Wind speed	Pressure	Areas affected	Damage (USD)	Deaths	Refs
Unnamed	August 30 – September 11, 1853	150 mph (240 km/h)	924 hPa (27.29 inHg)	None	None	None	
Unnamed	August 7 – 14, 1856	150 mph (240 km/h)	934 hPa (27.58 inHg)	United States Gulf Coast			
Unnamed	September 20 – October 7, 1866	140 mph (220 km/h)	938 hPa (27.70 inHg)	The Caribbean			
Unnamed	September 24 – October 9, 1878	140 mph (220 km/h)	938 hPa (27.70 inHg)	The Caribbean			
Unnamed	August 4 – 14, 1880	150 mph (240 km/h)	931 hPa (27.49 inHg)	The Caribbean, Mexico, Texas			
Unnamed	September 27 – October 11, 1880	140 mph (220 km/h)	928 hPa (27.40 inHg)	None	None	None	
Unnamed	October 4 - 18, 1882	140 mph (220 km/h)	975 hPa (28.79 inHg)	The Caribbean, Southeastern United States			
Unnamed	August 12 - 21, 1886	150 mph (240 km/h)	925 hPa (27.32 inHg)				
Unnamed	September 27 - October 5, 1893	130 mph (215 km/h)	948 hPa (27.99 inHg)				
Unnamed	October 11 -20, 1894	130 mph (215 km/h)	931 hPa (27.49 inHg)				
Unnamed	September 25 - October 6, 1898	130 mph (215 km/h)	938 hPa (27.70 inHg)	Eastern United States, Atlantic Canada			
Unnamed	August 3 - September 4, 1899	150 mph (240 km/h)	930 hPa (27.46 inHg)	The Caribbean, Eastern United States, Atlantic Canada			
Unnamed	August 27 - September 15, 1900	145 mph (230 km/h)	936 hPa (27.64 inHg)	The Caribbean, Eastern United States, Atlantic Canada			
Unnamed	August 25 – September 12, 1906	130 mph (215 km/h)	950 hPa (28.05 inHg)	Lesser Antiles, Greater Antiles			
Unnamed	October 9 – 23, 1910	150 mph (240 km/h)	924 hPa (27.29 inHg)				
Unnamed	August 5 – 23, 1915	145 mph (230 km/h)	940 hPa (27.76 inHg)				
Unnamed	September 21 – October 1, 1915	145 mph (230 km/h)	931 hPa (27.49 inHg)				
Unnamed	August 12 – 20, 1916	130 mph (215 km/h)	932 hPa (27.52 inHg)				
Unnamed	September 20 – 30, 1917	150 mph (240 km/h)	928 hPa (27.40 inHg)				
Unnamed	September 2 – 16, 1919	150 mph (240 km/h)	927 hPa (27.37 inHg)				
Unnamed	October 20 – 30, 1921	140 mph (220 km/h)	941 hPa (27.79 inHg)				
Unnamed	July 22 - August 2, 1926	140 mph (220 km/h)	967 hPa (28.56 inHg)				
Unnamed	September 1 – 21, 1926	140 mph (220 km/h)	957 hPa (28.26 inHg)				
Unnamed	September 11 – 22, 1926	150 mph (240 km/h)	930 hPa (27.46 inHg)				
Unnamed	October 14 – 28, 1926	150 mph (240 km/h)	934 hPa (27.58 inHg)				
Unnamed	September 22 – October 4, 1929	155 mph (250 km/h)	924 hPa (27.29 inHg)	The Bahamas, Eastern United States, Atlantic Canada			
Unnamed	August 29 – September 17, 1930	155 mph (250 km/h)	933 hPa (27.55 inHg)	The Caribbean, Southeastern United States			
Unnamed	September 1931	130 mph (215 km/h)	952 hPa (28.11 inHg)				
Unnamed	August 1932	150 mph (240 km/h)	935 hPa (27.61 inHg)				
Unnamed	September 1932	145 mph (230 km/h)	943 hPa (27.85 inHg)				
Unnamed	August 1933	140 mph (220 km/h)	940 hPa (27.76 inHg)				
Unnamed	August, September 1933	140 mph (220 km/h)	945 hPa (27.91 inHg)				
Unnamed	September 1933	140 mph (220 km/h)	947 hPa (27.96 inHg)				
Unnamed	August 1935	130 mph (215 km/h)	955 hPa (28.20 inHg)				
Unnamed	September, October 1935	140 mph (220 km/h)	945 hPa (27.91 inHg)				
Unnamed	October 1939	140 mph (220 km/h)	941 hPa (27.79 inHg)				
Unnamed	September 1941	130 mph (215 km/h)	957 hPa (28.26 inHg)				
Unnamed	August 1943	140 mph (220 km/h)	–				
Unnamed	October 1944	145 mph (230 km/h)	937 hPa (27.67 inHg)				
Unnamed	September 1945	130 mph (215 km/h)	949 hPa (28.02 inHg)				
Unnamed	September 1947	145 mph (230 km/h)	938 hPa (27.70 inHg)				
Unnamed	September 1948	130 mph (215 km/h)	940 hPa (27.76 inHg)				
Unnamed	September 1948	130 mph (215 km/h)	940 hPa (27.76 inHg)				
Unnamed	August 1949	130 mph (215 km/h)	954 hPa (28.17 inHg)				

=== 1950–1974 ===
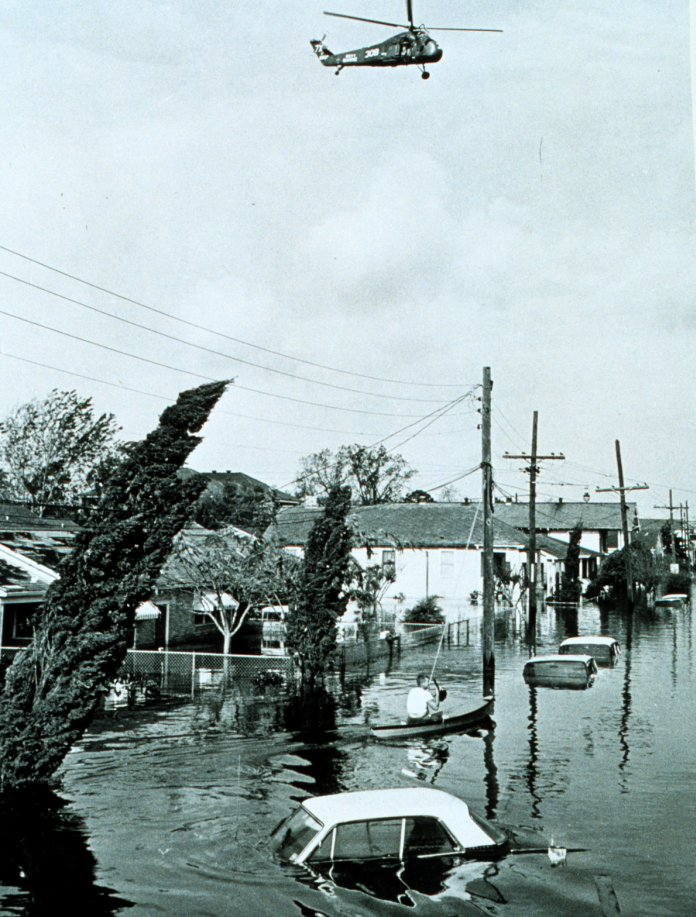
Flooding in the Lower Ninth Ward of New Orleans after Betsy.

In the years between 1950 and 1974, there were 26 Category 4 hurricanes in the Atlantic Ocean. A dagger (†) denotes that the storm temporarily weakened below Category 4 intensity during the specified period of time.

List of Category 4 Atlantic hurricanes from 1950 to 1974
Storm name	Track	Season	Dates as a Category 4	Maximum sustained winds	Minimum pressure	Notes
Dog		1950	September 1–7†	145 mph (230 km/h)	943 mbar (hPa; 27.85 inHg)	
Fox		1950	September 14–15	140 mph (220 km/h)	946 mbar (hPa; 27.94 inHg)	
King		1950	October 18	130 mph (215 km/h)	955 mbar (hPa; 28.2 inHg)	
Charlie		1951	August 19	130 mph (215 km/h)	958 mbar (hPa; 28.29 inHg)	
Easy		1951	September 7–8	150 mph (240 km/h)	937 mbar (hPa; 27.67 inHg)	
Fox		1952	October 15	145 mph (230 km/h)	934 mbar (hPa; 27.58 inHg)	
Hazel		1954	October 23–24	130 mph (215 km/h)	938 mbar (hPa; 27.70 inHg)	
Connie		1955	August 7	140 mph (220 km/h)	944 mbar (hPa; 27.88 inHg)	
Ione		1955	September 18	140 mph (220 km/h)	938 mbar (hPa; 27.70 inHg)	
Carrie		1957	September 7–8	140 mph (220 km/h)	945 mbar (hPa; 27.91 inHg)	
Cleo		1958	August 16	140 mph (220 km/h)	947 mbar (hPa; 27.96 inHg)	
Daisy		1958	August 28	130 mph (215 km/h)	948 mbar (hPa; 27.99 inHg)	
Helene		1958	September 27	150 mph (240 km/h)	930 mbar (hPa; 27.46 inHg)	
Gracie		1959	September 29	140 mph (220 km/h)	950 mbar (hPa; 28.05 inHg)	
Donna		1960	September 6–10†	145 mph (230 km/h)	930 mbar (hPa; 27.46 inHg)	
Betsy		1961	September 5–6	130 mph (215 km/h)	945 mbar (hPa; 27.91 inHg)	
Carla		1961	September 10-11	145 mph (233 km/h)	927 mbar (hPa; 27.73 inHg)	
Frances		1961	October 7	130 mph (215 km/h)	948 mbar (hPa; 27.99 inHg)	
Flora		1963	October 2–3	150 mph (240 km/h)	933 mbar (hPa; 27.55 inHg)	
Cleo		1964	August 23–24	150 mph (240 km/h)	938 mbar (hPa; 27.70 inHg)	
Dora		1964	September 6	130 mph (215 km/h)	942 mbar (hPa; 27.82 inHg)	
Gladys		1964	September 17	130 mph (215 km/h)	945 mbar (hPa; 27.91 inHg)	
Hilda		1964	October 1–2	140 mph (220 km/h)	941 mbar (hPa; 27.79 inHg)	
Betsy		1965	September 4–9†	140 mph (220 km/h)	942 mbar (hPa; 27.82 inHg)	
Celia		1970	August 3	140 mph (220 km/h)	944 mbar (hPa; 27.88 inHg)	
Edith		1971	September 9	150 mph (240 km/h)	943 mbar (hPa; 27.85 inHg)	
Becky		1974	August 9	130 mph (215 km/h)	977 mbar (hPa; 27.85 inHg)	
Carmen		1974	September 1–7†	155 mph (240 km/h)	928 mbar (hPa; 27.40 inHg)	
Sources: Atlantic Hurricane Best Track File 1851–2012

=== 1975–1999 ===
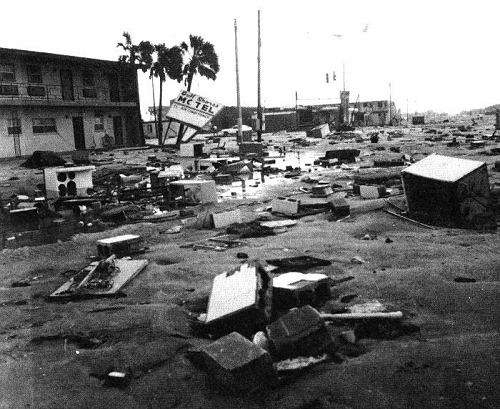
Damage after Hurricane Frederic in Gulf Shores, Alabama.

In the years between 1976 and 1999, 23 Category 4 hurricanes formed in the basin:

List of Category 4 Atlantic hurricanes from 1976 to 2000
Storm name	Track	Season	Dates as a Category 4	Maximum sustained winds	Minimum pressure	Notes
Gladys		1975	October 2–3	150 mph (240 km/h)	939 mbar (hPa; 27.73 inHg)	
Ella		1978	September 4	140 mph (220 km/h)	956 mbar (hPa; 28.23 inHg)	
Greta		1978	September 18	130 mph (215 km/h)	947 mbar (hPa; 27.96 inHg)	
Frederic		1979	September 12–13	130 mph (215 km/h)	943 mbar (hPa; 27.85 inHg)	
Harvey		1981	September 14	130 mph (215 km/h)	946 mbar (hPa; 27.94 inHg)	
Debby		1982	September 18	130 mph (215 km/h)	950 mbar (hPa; 28.05 inHg)	
Diana		1984	September 11-12	130 mph (215 km/h)	949 mbar (hPa; 28.02 inHg)	
Gloria		1985	September 24-25	145 mph (230 km/h)	919 mbar (hPa; 27.14 inHg)	
Helene		1988	September 22-23	145 mph (230 km/h)	938 mbar (hPa; 27.70 inHg)	
Joan		1988	October 21-22	145 mph (230 km/h)	932 mbar (hPa; 27.52 inHg)	
Gabrielle		1989	September 4–7	145 mph (230 km/h)	937 mbar (hPa; 27.67 inHg)	
Claudette		1991	September 7	130 mph (215 km/h)	944 mbar (hPa; 27.88 inHg)	
Felix		1995	August 12-13	140 mph (220 km/h)	929 mbar (hPa; 27.43 inHg)	
Luis		1995	September 1-8	150 mph (240 km/h)	935 mbar (hPa; 27.61 inHg)	
Opal		1995	October 4	150 mph (240 km/h)	916 mbar (hPa; 27.05 inHg)	
Edouard		1996	August 25-28†	145 mph (230 km/h)	933 mbar (hPa; 27.55 inHg)	
Hortense		1996	September 12–13	140 mph (220 km/h)	935 mbar (hPa; 27.61 inHg)	
Georges		1998	September 19-20	155 mph (250 km/h)	937 mbar (hPa; 27.67 inHg)	
Bret		1999	August 22	145 mph (230 km/h)	944 mbar (hPa; 27.88 inHg)	
Cindy		1999	August 28-29	140 mph (220 km/h)	942 mbar (hPa; 27.82 inHg)	
Floyd		1999	September 12-14†	155 mph (250 km/h)	921 mbar (hPa; 27.2 inHg)	
Gert		1999	September 15–17†	150 mph (240 km/h)	930 mbar (hPa; 27.46 inHg)	
Lenny		1999	November 17-18	155 mph (250 km/h)	933 mbar (hPa; 27.55 inHg)	
Sources: Atlantic Hurricane Best Track File 1851–2012

=== 2000–2025 ===
In the years between 2000 and 2025, 40 Category 4 hurricanes formed within the confines of the Atlantic Ocean. A dagger (†) denotes that the storm temporarily weakened below Category 4 intensity during the specified period of time.

List of Category 4 Atlantic hurricanes from 2000–present
Storm name	Track	Season	Dates as a Category 4	Maximum sustained winds	Minimum pressure	Notes
Isaac		2000	September 28–29	140 mph (220 km/h)	943 mbar (hPa; 27.85 inHg)	
Keith		2000	October 1	140 mph (220 km/h)	939 mbar (hPa; 27.73 inHg)	
Iris		2001	October 8–9	145 mph (230 km/h)	948 mbar (hPa; 27.99 inHg)	
Michelle		2001	November 3–4†	140 mph (220 km/h)	933 mbar (hPa; 27.55 inHg)	
Lili		2002	October 2–3	145 mph (230 km/h)	938 mbar (hPa; 27.70 inHg)	
Fabian		2003	August 31–September 5†	145 mph (230 km/h)	939 mbar (hPa; 27.73 inHg)	
Charley		2004	August 13	150 mph (240 km/h)	941 mbar (hPa; 27.79 inHg)	
Frances		2004	August 28–September 2†	145 mph (230 km/h)	935 mbar (hPa; 27.61 inHg)	
Karl		2004	September 20–21†	145 mph (230 km/h)	938 mbar (hPa; 27.70 inHg)	
Dennis		2005	July 8–10†	150 mph (240 km/h)	930 mbar (hPa; 27.46 inHg)	
Gustav		2008	August 30–31	155 mph (250 km/h)	941 mbar (hPa; 27.79 inHg)	
Ike		2008	September 4–8†	145 mph (230 km/h)	935 mbar (hPa; 27.61 inHg)	
Omar		2008	October 16	130 mph (215 km/h)	958 mbar (hPa; 28.29 inHg)	
Paloma		2008	November 8	145 mph (230 km/h)	944 mbar (hPa; 27.88 inHg)	
Bill		2009	August 19–20	130 mph (215 km/h)	943 mbar (hPa; 27.85 inHg)	
Danielle		2010	August 27	130 mph (215 km/h)	942 mbar (hPa; 27.82 inHg)	
Earl		2010	August 30–September 2†	145 mph (230 km/h)	927 mbar (hPa; 27.37 inHg)	
Igor		2010	September 12–17	155 mph (250 km/h)	924 mbar (hPa; 27.29 inHg)	
Julia		2010	September 15	140 mph (220 km/h)	948 mbar (hPa; 27.99 inHg)	
Katia		2011	September 6	140 mph (220 km/h)	942 mbar (hPa; 27.82 inHg)	
Ophelia		2011	October 2	140 mph (220 km/h)	940 mbar (hPa; 27.76 inHg)	
Gonzalo		2014	October 15–17†	145 mph (230 km/h)	940 mbar (hPa; 27.76 inHg)	
Joaquin		2015	October 1–3†	155 mph (250 km/h)	931 mbar (hPa; 27.64 inHg)	
Nicole		2016	October 12–13	140 mph (220 km/h)	950 mbar (hPa; 28.05 inHg)	
Harvey		2017	August 26	130 mph (215 km/h)	937 mbar (hPa; 27.67 inHg)	
Jose		2017	September 8–10	155 mph (250 km/h)	938 mbar (hPa; 27.70 inHg)	
Florence		2018	September 5–12†	150 mph (240 km/h)	937 mbar (hPa; 27.67 inHg)	
Laura		2020	August 26–27	150 mph (240 km/h)	937 mbar (hPa; 27.67 inHg)	
Teddy		2020	September 17–18	140 mph (220 km/h)	945 mbar (hPa; 27.91 inHg)	
Delta		2020	October 6	140 mph (220 km/h)	953 mbar (hPa; 28.14 inHg)	
Eta		2020	November 2–3	150 mph (240 km/h)	923 mbar (hPa; 27.26 inHg)	
Iota		2020	November 16–17	155 mph (250 km/h)	917 mbar (hPa; 27.08 inHg)	
Ida		2021	August 29	150 mph (240 km/h)	929 mbar (hPa; 27.43 inHg)	
Sam		2021	September 25–October 2†	155 mph (250 km/h)	927 mbar (hPa; 27.4 inHg)	
Fiona		2022	September 21–23	140 mph (220 km/h)	931 mbar (hPa; 27.34 inHg)	
Franklin		2023	August 28–29	150 mph (240 km/h)	926 mbar (hPa; 27.67 inHg)	
Idalia		2023	August 30	130 mph (215 km/h)	942 mbar (hPa; 27.82 inHg)	
Helene		2024	September 26	140 mph (220 km/h)	939 mbar (hPa; 27.73 inHg)	
Kirk		2024	October 3–5	150 mph (230 km/h)	928 mbar (hPa; 27.58 inHg)	
Gabrielle		2025	September 22–23	140 mph (220 km/h)	944 mbar (hPa; 27.88 inHg)	
Sources: Atlantic Hurricane Best Track File 1851–2021

== Number by month ==
Number of recorded Category 4 Atlantic hurricanes by month
Month	Number of hurricanes
June	1
July	2
August	40
September	52
October	46
November	5

== Landfalls ==
The following hurricanes from the above lists made landfall at some location while a tropical cyclone with winds of greater than 39 mph (63 km/h). Due to inaccuracies in data, tropical depression landfalls are not included. Category 5 hurricanes are also not included in the table below. Several of these storms weakened slightly after attaining Category 4 status as they approached land; this is usually a result of dry air, shallower water due to shelving, cooler waters, or interaction with land.

Name	Year	Category 4	Category 3	Category 2	Category 1	Tropical storm
"Last Island"	1856	Louisiana				
"Unnamed"	1866	Bahamas				
"Unnamed"	1878				Haiti & Turks and Caicos Islands	
"Unnamed"	1880	Texas		Quintana Roo		Guadeloupe
"Unnamed"	1882	Cuba			Florida	
Indianola	1886	Texas		Dominican Republic & Cuba		
Cheniere Caminada	1893	Louisiana		Quintana Roo & Mississippi		
Unnamed	1894			Saint Lucia		
Georgia	1898	Georgia				
San Ciriaco	1899	Guadeloupe & Puerto Rico	Bahamas & North Carolina			
Galveston (1900)	1900	Texas				Antigua, Nevis, Dominican Republic & Cuba
Unnamed	1910		Cuba	Florida		
Galveston (1915)	1915	Texas	Jamaica		Guadeloupe	
New Orleans	1915		Louisiana			
Florida Keys	1919		Bahamas & Texas			Puerto Rico
Tampa Bay	1921		Florida			
Nassau	1926	Bahamas		Florida		
Miami	1926	Bahamas & Florida	Alabama			
Unnamed	1926	Cuba	Bermuda			
Unnamed	1929	Bahamas		Florida		Florida
San Zenón	1930	Dominican Republic			Guadeloupe	Cuba & Florida
Unnamed	1932	Texas				
San Ciprián	1932	Puerto Rico		Dominican Republic		Belize
Chesapeake–Potomac	1933			North Carolina		
Treasure Coast	1933	Bahamas	Florida			
Outer Banks	1933			North Carolina	Nova Scotia	
Unnamed	1945	Florida	Bahamas			South Carolina
Unnamed	1948	Florida	Cuba			
Unnamed	1949	Florida	Bahamas			
Charlie	1951	Quintana Roo	Tamaulipas	Jamaica		Dominica
King	1950	Florida			Cuba	
Fox	1952	Cuba			Bahamas	Bahamas
Hazel	1954	North Carolina		Haiti & Turks and Caicos Islands		
Connie	1955			North Carolina		
Carrie	1957				Azores	
Helene	1958		North Carolina		Newfoundland	
Gracie	1959	South Carolina				
Donna	1960	Florida	Barbuda, Anguilla, & Bahamas	North Carolina, New York & Connecticut		
Carla	1961	Texas				
Flora	1963	Haiti	Tobago & Cuba		Cuba	
Cleo	1964	Guadeloupe & Haiti		Florida	Cuba	Georgia
Dora	1964		Florida			
Hilda	1964		Louisiana			
Betsy	1965	Louisiana	Bahamas & Florida			
Celia	1970	Texas				
Edith	1971	Nicaragua		Louisiana	Belize, Mexico	
Carmen	1974	Quintana Roo	Louisiana			
Greta	1978	Honduras		Belize		
Frederic	1979	Alabama				Puerto Rico, Dominican Republic & Cuba
Diana	1984			North Carolina		
Gloria	1985			North Carolina	New York & Connecticut	
Joan	1988	Nicaragua				Grenada, Colombia & Venezuela
Luis	1995	Barbuda				
Opal	1995		Florida			Yucatán Peninsula
Hortense	1996				Puerto Rico & Nova Scotia	Guadeloupe
Georges	1998		Antigua, Saint Kitts, Puerto Rico & Dominican Republic	Florida & Mississippi	Cuba	
Bret	1999		Texas			
Floyd	1999	Bahamas	Bahamas	North Carolina		Virginia, New Jersey, New York & Connecticut
Lenny	1999		Saint Martin	Anguilla	Saint Barthélemy	Antigua
Keith	2000				Belize & Tamaulipas	
Iris	2001	Belize				
Michelle	2001	Cuba			Bahamas	
Lili	2002			Cuba	Cayman Islands & Louisiana	
Charley	2004	Florida	Cuba		South Carolina	
Frances	2004		Bahamas	Bahamas & Florida		Florida
Dennis	2005	Cuba	Florida			
Gustav	2008	Cuba (2x)		Louisiana	Haiti	Jamaica
Ike	2008	Cuba	Bahamas	Texas	Cuba	
Paloma	2008			Cuba		
Bill	2009					Newfoundland
Earl	2010				Nova Scotia	Prince Edward Island
Igor	2010				Newfoundland	
Gonzalo	2014			Bermuda	Antigua, Saint Martin & Anguilla	
Joaquin	2015	Bahamas	Bahamas (2x)			
Harvey	2017	Texas	Texas			Barbados, Saint Vincent & Louisiana
Florence	2018				North Carolina	
Laura	2020	Louisiana				Antigua, Nevis, Dominican Republic & Cuba (2x)
Delta	2020			Quintana Roo & Louisiana		
Eta	2020	Nicaragua				Cuba & Florida (2x)
Iota	2020	Nicaragua				
Ida	2021	Louisiana			Cuba	
Fiona	2022		Grand Turk Island		Puerto Rico & Dominican Republic	Guadeloupe
Franklin	2023					Dominican Republic
Idalia	2023		Florida			
Helene	2024	Florida				

== See also ==
- Atlantic hurricane season
- Lists of Atlantic hurricanes
- List of Category 3 Atlantic hurricanes
- List of Category 4 Pacific hurricanes
- List of Category 5 Atlantic hurricanes
- List of Category 5 Pacific hurricanes
