= 1933 Treasure Coast hurricane =

Category 4 Atlantic hurricane in 1933

Hurricane Eleven 1933 Treasure Coast hurricane
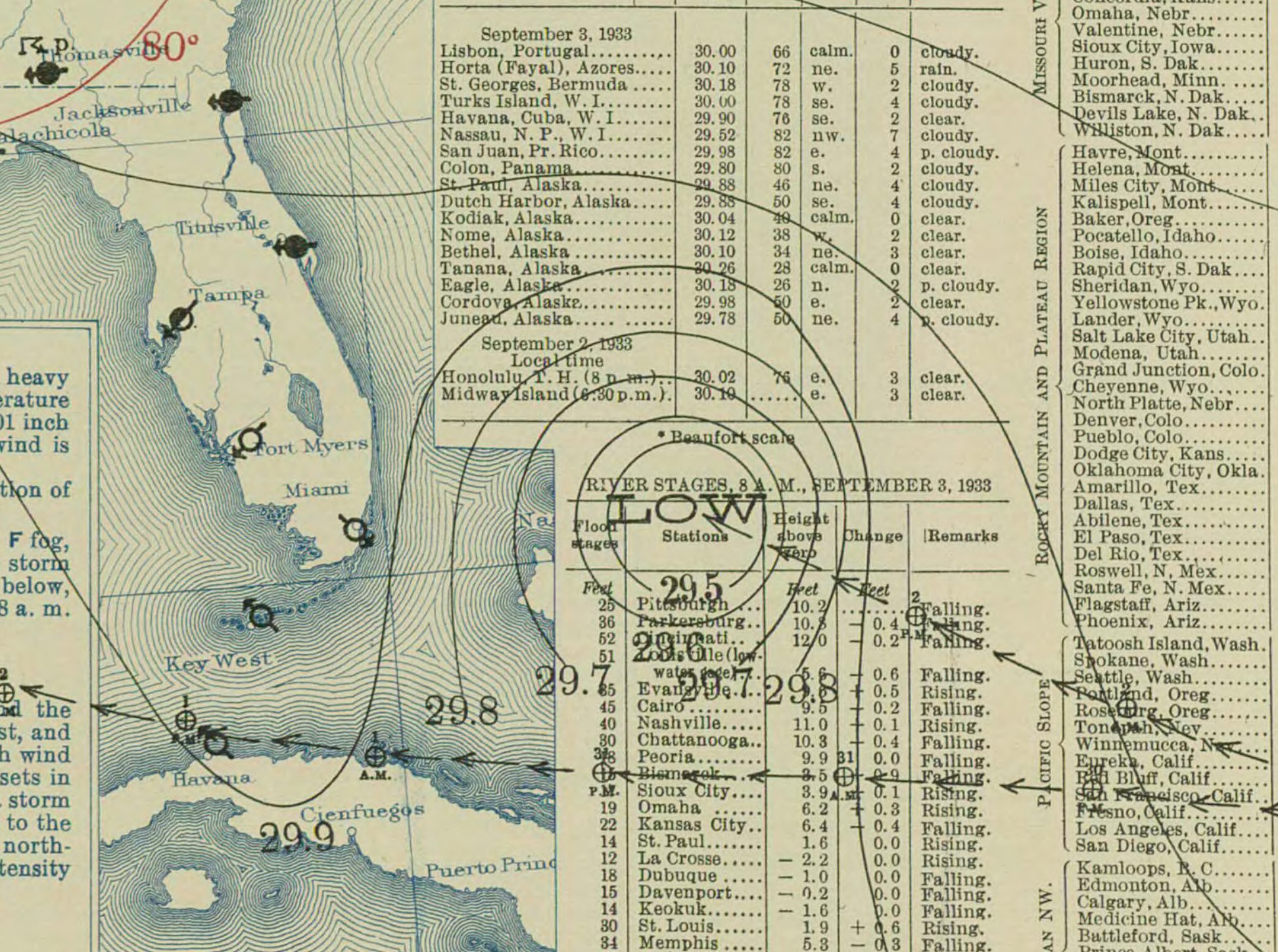
- Surface weather analysis of the hurricane approaching the East Coast of Florida on September 3

Meteorological history
- Formed: August 31, 1933
- Dissipated: September 7, 1933

Category 4 major hurricane
- 1-minute sustained (SSHWS/NWS)
- Highest winds: 140 mph (220 km/h)
- Lowest pressure: ≤945 mbar (hPa); ≤27.91 inHg

Overall effects
- Fatalities: 3 total
- Damage: $3 million (1933 USD)
- Areas affected: The Bahamas, Florida, Georgia, The Carolinas
- IBTrACS
- Part of the 1933 Atlantic hurricane season

The 1933 Treasure Coast hurricane (Note: Tropical cyclones in the Atlantic basin were not formally named prior to World War II. Storms such as this one were denoted by their attributes, including coincidence with Catholic saints' feasts.) was the second-most intense tropical cyclone to strike the United States during the active 1933 Atlantic hurricane season. The eleventh tropical storm, fifth hurricane, and the third major hurricane of the season, it formed east-northeast of the Leeward Islands on August 31. The tropical storm moved rapidly west-northwestward, steadily intensifying to a hurricane. It acquired peak winds of 140 mph (220 km/h) and passed over portions of the Bahamas on September 3, including Eleuthera and Harbour Island, causing severe damage to crops, buildings, and infrastructure. Winds over 100 mph (160 km/h) affected many islands in its path, especially those that encountered its center, and many wharves were ruined.

Subsequently, it weakened and made landfall at Jupiter, Florida, early on September 4 with winds of 125 mph (205 km/h). The hurricane moved across the state, passing near Tampa before moving into Georgia and dissipating. In Florida, the strong winds of the cyclone blew buildings off their foundations, and numerous trees were prostrated in citrus groves. The Treasure Coast region received the most extensive destruction, and Stuart, Jupiter, and Fort Pierce were heavily damaged. The storm was locally regarded as the most severe on record in 50 years. Inland, the cyclone weakened rapidly but produced prodigious amounts of rain, causing a dam to collapse near Tampa. The storm caused $3 million in damage (1933 USD) after damaging or destroying 6,848 homes.

Unusually, the storm hit Florida less than 24 hours before another major hurricane bearing 125-mph (205-km/h) winds struck South Texas; never have two major cyclones hit the United States in such close succession.

== Meteorological history ==
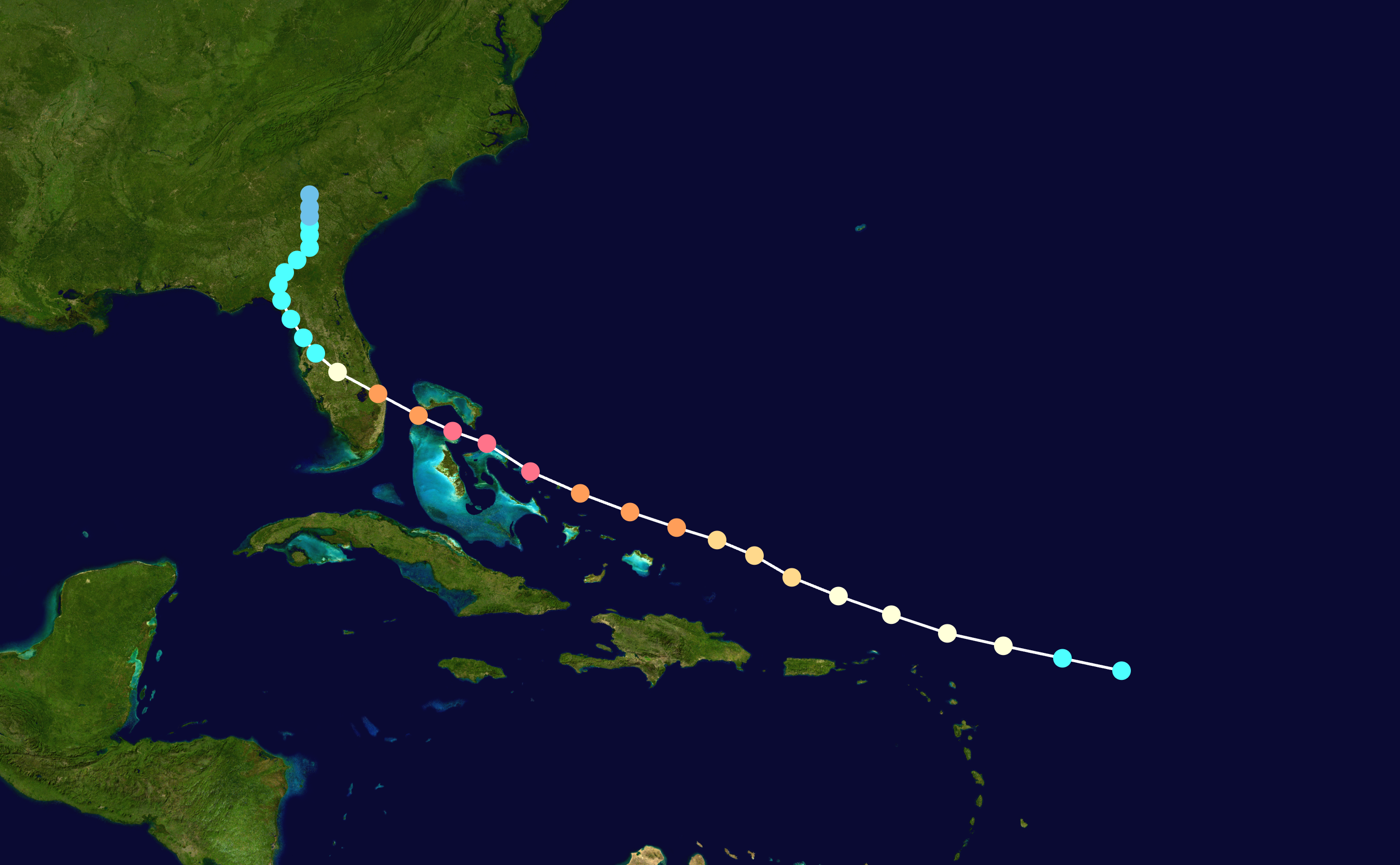
Map plotting the storm's track and intensity, according to the Saffir–Simpson scale Map key Saffir–Simpson scale Tropical depression (≤38 mph, ≤62 km/h) Tropical storm (39–73 mph, 63–118 km/h) Category 1 (74–95 mph, 119–153 km/h) Category 2 (96–110 mph, 154–177 km/h) Category 3 (111–129 mph, 178–208 km/h) Category 4 (130–156 mph, 209–251 km/h) Category 5 (≥157 mph, ≥252 km/h) Unknown Storm type Tropical cyclone Subtropical cyclone Extratropical cyclone, remnant low, tropical disturbance, or monsoon depression

The origins of the hurricane were from a tropical wave that possibly spawned a tropical depression on August 27, although there was minimal data over the next few days as it tracked to the west-northwest. On August 31, a nearby ship reported gale-force winds, which indicated that a tropical storm had developed to the east-northeast of the Lesser Antilles. Based on continuity, it is estimated the storm attained hurricane status later that day. Moving quickly to the west-northwest, the storm passed north of the Lesser Antilles and Puerto Rico. Early on September 2, a ship called the Gulfwing reported a barometric pressure of 978 mb (28.9 inHg), which confirmed that the storm attained hurricane status. After passing north of the Turks and Caicos islands, the hurricane struck Eleuthera and Harbour Island in the Bahamas on September 3, the latter at 11:00 UTC. A station on the latter island reported a pressure of 27.90 inHg (945 mb) during the half-hour-long passage of the eye. Based on the pressure and the small size of the storm, it is estimated the hurricane struck Harbour Island with peak winds of 140 mph (220 km/h), making it the equivalent of a modern Category 4 hurricane on the Saffir-Simpson scale. Interpolation suggested that the storm reached major hurricane status, or Category 3 status, on September 2.

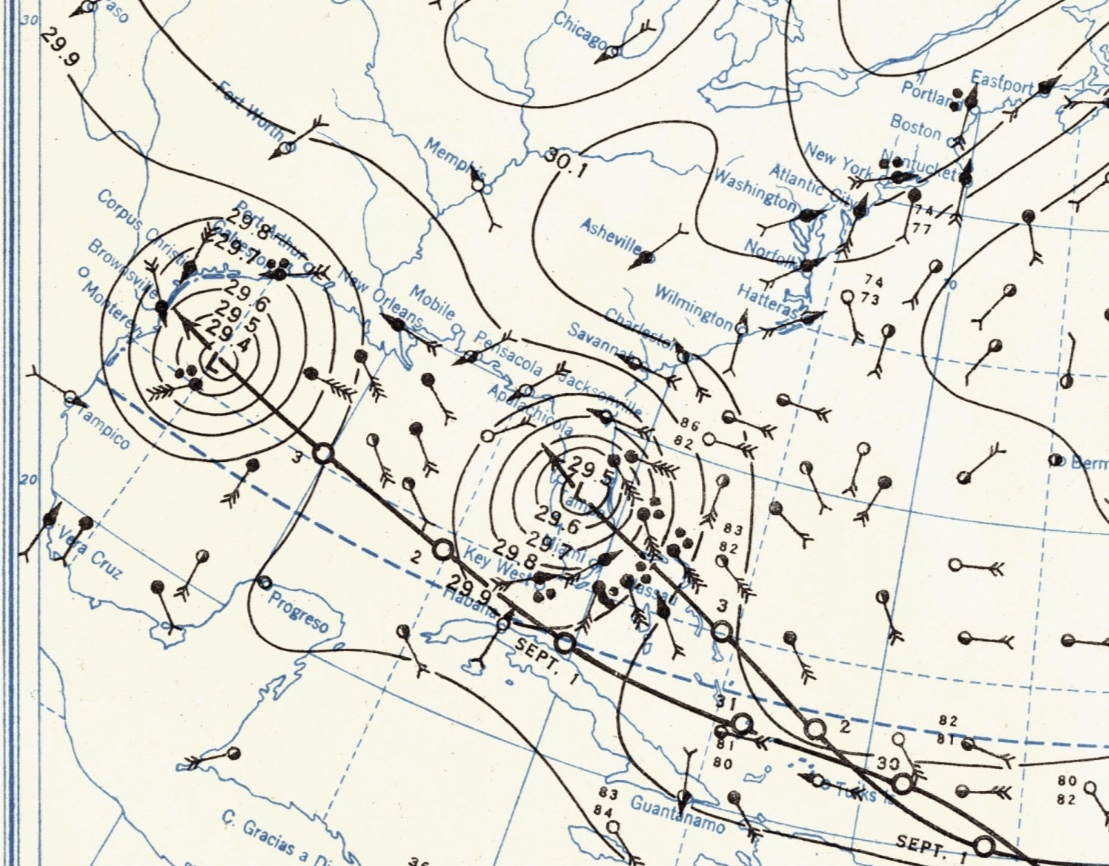
Weather map of the storm over Florida on September 4, with another hurricane to the west approaching South Texas

The hurricane initially followed the course of another hurricane that passed through the area in late August, which ultimately struck Cuba and Texas. This hurricane instead maintained a general west-northwest track. After moving through the northern Bahamas, the hurricane weakened slightly before making landfall at Jupiter, Florida, at 05:00 UTC on September 4. A station there reported a pressure of 27.98 inHg (948 mb) during a 40-minute period of the eye's passage; this suggested a landfall strength of 125 mph (205 km/h). At the time, the radius of maximum winds was an estimated 15 nmi (15 mi, 30 km), which was smaller than average. After landfall, the hurricane weakened rapidly while crossing the state. It briefly emerged into the Gulf of Mexico as a tropical storm early on September 5. A few hours later while continuing to the northwest, it made another landfall near Rosewood—a ghost town in Levy County, east of Cedar Key—with winds of about 65 mph (100 km/h). Turning to the north, the storm slowly weakened as it crossed into Georgia, dissipating on September 7 near Augusta.

== Preparations ==
On September 2, a fleet of eight aircraft evacuated all white residents from West End, Grand Bahama, to Daytona Beach, Florida. While the storm was near peak intensity on September 3, the Weather Bureau issued hurricane warnings from Miami to Melbourne, Florida, with storm warnings extending northward to Jacksonville. Later that day, storm warnings, were issued from Key West to Cedar Key. About 2,500 people evacuated by train from areas around Lake Okeechobee. By evening on September 3, high tides sent sea spray over coastal seawalls in Palm Beach County as residents boarded up buildings; structures on Clematis Street in West Palm Beach were said to be a "solid front" of plywood. Along the coast, observers reported very rough seas as the eye neared land.

== Impact ==
=== The Bahamas ===
The powerful hurricane moved over or near several islands in the Bahamas. Winds on Spanish Wells and Harbour Island were both estimated at 140 mph (225 km/h). Winds reached 110 mph (180 km/h) at Governor's Harbour, 100 mph (160 km/h) on Eleuthera, and 120 mph (190 km/h) on the Abaco Islands. The storm was farther away from Nassau, where winds reached 61 mph (98 km/h). The hurricane damaged a lumber mill on Abaco, washing away a dock. Heavy damage occurred on Harbour Island, including to several roofs, the walls of government buildings, and the water system. The hurricane destroyed four churches and 37 houses, leaving 100 people homeless. A 1 1/2-mile-long (2.4 km) road on Eleuthera was destroyed. Several islands sustained damage to farms, including the total loss of various fruit trees on Russell Island. Despite Category 4 winds on Spanish Wells, only five houses were destroyed, although most of the remaining dwellings lost their roofs. Collectively between North Point, James Cistern, and Gregory Town on Eleuthera, the storm destroyed 55 houses and damaged many others. On Grand Bahama, where a 9-to-12-foot-high (2.7 to 3.7 m) storm surge was reported, half of the houses were destroyed, as were 13 boats and two planes, and most docks were wrecked.

=== Florida ===
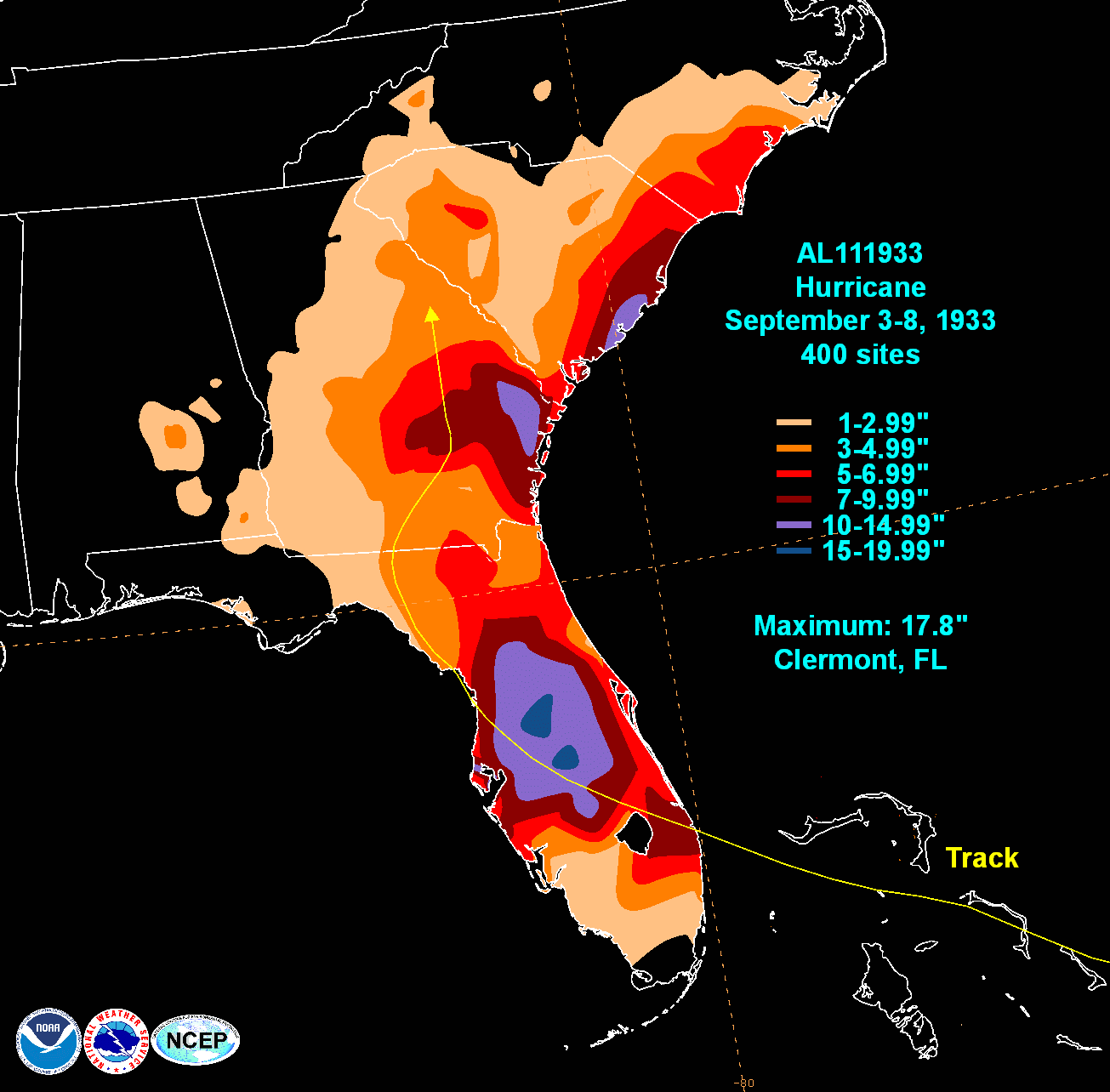
Map of the total precipitation from the hurricane across Florida and the Southeast United States

When the storm moved ashore in Florida, winds reached an estimated 125 mph (200 km/h) in Jupiter; these occurred after the eye passed. In West Palm Beach, anemometers measured at least 80-mile-per-hour (130 km/h) winds with gusts to 100 mph (160 km/h); barometers ranged from 28.64 to 28.78 inHg (970 to 975 mb). The storm produced the strongest winds in the city since the 1928 Okeechobee hurricane. Winds were not as strong farther from the center; 40-to-45-mile-per-hour (64 to 72 km/h) winds were observed in Miami to the south, Titusville to the north, and Tampa on the west coast. At Stuart the lowest atmospheric pressure was measured as 28.60 inHg (969 mb), while Indiantown, on the edge of the eye, registered 28.25 inHg (957 mb). Fort Pierce estimated peak winds of 80 to 90 mph (130 to 145 km/h), and pressures dipped to 29.14 inHg (987 mb). Inland, winds near Lake Okeechobee peaked at only 60 mph (97 km/h). The hurricane dropped heavy rainfall along its path, peaking at 17.8 in (450 mm) in Clermont.

Crop damage was worst along the Indian River Lagoon; several farms in Stuart experienced total losses, and statewide, 16% of the citrus crop, or 4 million boxes, were destroyed. Across southeastern Florida, the hurricane damaged 6,465 houses and destroyed another 383, causing over $3 million in damage. One person, an African American farm worker, was killed when his shack blew down in Gomez, a brakeman died after seven railcars derailed, and a child was killed by airborne debris.

==== South Florida ====
At West Palm Beach, the majority of the damage was confined to vegetation. Several coconut and royal palms that withstood the 1928 hurricane snapped, littering streets with broken trunks. Winds downed road signs on many streets, and floodwaters covered the greens on a local golf course. Some garages and isolated structures, mostly lightweight, were partly or totally destroyed, along with a lumber warehouse. Some homes that lost roofing shingles had water damage to their interiors as well. Nearby Lake Worth sustained extensive breakage of windows, including plate glass, and loss of tile and shingle roofing, but preparations reduced losses to just several thousand dollars, and no post-storm accidents took place. Strong winds snapped many light poles in the city, and trees and shrubs were broken or uprooted. As in Lake Worth, officials in West Palm Beach credited preparations and stringent building codes with reducing overall damage. The city had learned from previous experience with severe storms in 1926, 1928, and 1929. High tides eroded Ocean Boulevard at several spots and disrupted access to several bridges on the Lake Worth Lagoon. Winter estates and hotels on Palm Beach generally sustained little material damage, except to vegetation, and county properties went largely unscathed.

==== Treasure Coast ====
Damage from the Treasure Coast

In Martin and St. Lucie counties, the storm was considered among the worst on record. The storm leveled some homes and swept many others off their foundations. Most structures in the worst-hit areas received at least minor damage, including the loss of tarpaper roofing and shingles.

At Stuart, winds removed or badly damaged three-quarters of the roofs in town. The storm destroyed the third floor of the building that housed a bowling alley and the Stuart News, a local newspaper. In Stuart, the storm left 400 to 500 people homeless, up to nearly 10% of the population, which was 5,100 at the time. A major landmark, the multi-story Walter Kitching store, collapsed during the storm. An old laundromat was likewise leveled, a private airport destroyed, and a water tower downed. Apartments and large hotels also incurred significant damage from rainwater. The county jail lost all its walls, but inmates opted to remain inside. In town thousands of coconuts, hurled by strong winds from trees, were salvaged by poor black residents. The St. Lucie River reportedly disgorged fish. Many chicken coops in Stuart were destroyed, and the local chicken population was scattered and dispersed as far as Indiantown.

Just to the south, at Olympia, an abandoned settlement also known as Olympia Beach, strong winds leveled the old Olympia Inn, a gas station, and the second floor of a pharmaceutical building. Winds also tore the roof off an ice plant. A bridge leading to the barrier island from Olympia was partly wrecked; the bridge tender survived by gripping the railing during the storm. Winds leveled his nearby home. According to the Monthly Weather Review, some of the most severe damage from the storm in Florida was at Olympia. At Hobe Sound, which experienced the storm's eye for five minutes, the hurricane inflicted severe damage and was considered by lifelong residents the worst storm in 50 years. Landmarks that withstood the 1928 Okeechobee hurricane were felled. Most structures west of the Florida East Coast Railway were severely damaged or wrecked. A filling station was scattered, and the platform at the local railroad station was strewn across the tracks. A railcar from West Palm Beach, blown north 30 mi (48 km), crashed into the platform, leaving a mass of wreckage that required several hours' manpower for removal. The storm left many homes in Hobe Sound uninhabitable, forcing crews to tear them down. Winter estates on the island, however, were better built and little damaged, though downed Australian pines, other trees, and electrical wires left coastal roadways essentially impassable. A 10-car garage at the Island Inn was flattened.

While Stuart and Hobe Sound sustained significant damage, Port Salerno suffered minimally. At Palm City the storm badly damaged structures and crops. A store sustained damage to such a degree that it was unusable, and a riverfront two-story home was leveled; on the latter's grounds all palm trees were downed. A well-constructed home, one of the sturdiest in Palm City, incurred only superficial damage, however. Most small houses in the area lost their roofs or were shifted on their foundations. The Niagara Fruit Company lost all its outbuildings and sustained severe damage to its main house. Many trees on site and on nearby farms were felled as well. At Tropical Farms most large properties were rendered uninhabitable, while a number of smaller homes were destroyed. Citrus trees, mainly grapefruit and orange, were prostrated, and the St. Lucie River overflowed its banks, submersing several properties. At Sewall's Point mansions were mostly negligibly damaged, except for losses of ornamental vegetation. 40-foot-tall (12 m) queen palms were felled, along with many tall coconut palms; several of the latter species were also left standing at an incline. Dozens of Australian pines were leveled as well.

Inland, at Indiantown, the storm wrecked outbuildings such as sheds, garages, and shacks, but otherwise did little damage to larger structures. The eye passed just north of town, causing a lull over rural land.

Between Jupiter and Fort Pierce, the storm knocked down power and telegraph lines. In the latter city, high waves washed out a portion of the causeway. In the 1980s, an elderly resident recalled that the storm was the most severe on record in Fort Pierce.

=== Elsewhere ===
A fallen tree at Pahokee

High rainfall caused flooding across Florida, notably near Tampa where waters reached 9 ft (2.7 m) deep. High rainfall of over 7 in (180 mm) caused a dam operated by Tampa Electric Co. to break 3 mi (4.8 km) northeast of Tampa along the Hillsborough River. The break resulted in severe local damage, flooding portions of Sulphur Springs. Workers attempted to save the dam with sandbags, and after the break, most residents in the area were warned of the approaching flood. Over 50 homes were flooded, forcing about 150 people to evacuate. Outside Florida, the storm produced winds of 48 and 51 mph (77 and 82 km/h) in Savannah, Georgia, and Charleston, South Carolina, respectively. In the latter city, the storm spawned a tornado, which caused about $10,000 in property damage. Heavy rainfall occurred along the Georgia and South Carolina coasts, reaching over 12 in (300 mm). Light rainfall also extended into North Carolina.

== Aftermath ==
In the Bahamas after the storm, a boat sailed from Nassau to deliver food and building materials to Eleuthera.

After the storm, the National Guard offered shelters for at least 400 homeless residents in Stuart. Of the 7,900 families adversely affected by the hurricane, 4,325 required assistance from the American Red Cross. Farmers in Texas, also affected by a major hurricane, requested growers in Florida wait 15 days so they could sell their citrus crop that fell. The damaged dam near Tampa initially resulted in waters from the Hillsborough River being pumped into the city's water treatment plant, and a new dam was eventually built in 1944.

== See also ==
- 1949 Florida hurricane – Produced major-hurricane conditions over the same region
- Hurricane Frances – Affected the same region as a slow-moving Category 2 hurricane
- List of Florida hurricanes (1900–49)

== Bibliography ==
- Barnes, Jay (1998). Florida's Hurricane History (1st ed.). Chapel Hill, North Carolina: UNC Press. ISBN 0-8078-2443-7 – via Internet Archive.
- Mitchell, C. L. (October 1933). "Tropical Disturbances of September 1933" (PDF). Monthly Weather Review. 61 (9). American Meteorological Society: 275–276. Bibcode:1933MWRv...61..274M. doi:10.1175/1520-0493(1933)61<274:TDOS>2.0.CO;2.
- Duedall, Iver W.; Williams, John M. (2002) [1997]. Florida Hurricanes and Tropical Storms, 1871–2001 (2nd ed.). Gainesville, Florida: University Press of Florida. ISBN 0-8130-2494-3 – via Internet Archive.
- Neely, Wayne (2006). The Major Hurricanes to Affect the Bahamas: Personal Recollections of Some of the Greatest Storms to Affect the Bahamas. Bloomington, Indiana: AuthorHouse. ISBN 1-4259-6608-X.
- Schoner, R. W.; Molansky, S. (July 1956). "Storms in the south Atlantic coastal region". Storm of September 4–8, 1933 (PDF) (Technical report). National Hurricane Research Project. Washington, D.C.: United States Weather Bureau. pp. 160–1. 3, Rainfall Associated with Hurricanes – via Weather Prediction Center.
- Souder, Mary O. (September 1933). "Severe Local Storms" (PDF). Monthly Weather Review. 61 (9): 291. Bibcode:1933MWRv...61..291.. doi:10.1175/1520-0493(1933)61<291:slss>2.0.co;2.
