= 1949 Florida hurricane =

Category 4 Atlantic hurricane in 1949

Hurricane Two
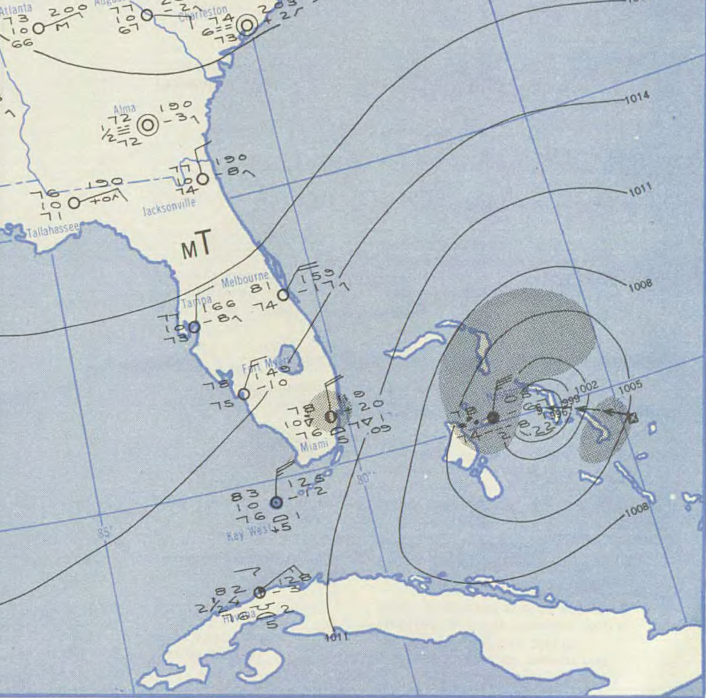
- Surface weather analysis of the hurricane approaching South Florida on August 26.

Meteorological history
- Formed: August 23, 1949
- Extratropical: August 29, 1949
- Dissipated: August 31, 1949

Category 4 major hurricane
- 1-minute sustained (SSHWS/NWS)
- Highest winds: 130 mph (215 km/h)
- Lowest pressure: 954 mbar (hPa); 28.17 inHg

Overall effects
- Fatalities: 2 direct, 1 indirect
- Damage: $52 million (1949 USD)
- Areas affected: Leeward Islands; Puerto Rico; Hispaniola; Turks and Caicos Islands; Cuba; The Bahamas; East Coast of the United States; Atlantic Canada
- IBTrACS
- Part of the 1949 Atlantic hurricane season

The 1949 Florida hurricane, also known as the Delray Beach hurricane, was a damaging and powerful tropical cyclone that caused significant damage in the southern portions of the state late in the month of August. The second recorded tropical cyclone of the annual hurricane season, the system originated from a tropical wave near the northern Leeward Islands on August 23. Already a tropical storm upon initial observations, the cyclone curved west-northwestward and intensified, becoming a hurricane on August 25. Rapid intensification ensued as the storm approached the central Bahamas early on August 26, with the storm reaching Category 4 hurricane strength later that day and peaking with maximum sustained winds of 130 mph (210 km/h) shortly after striking Andros. Late on August 26, the storm made landfall near Lake Worth, Florida, at the same intensity. The cyclone initially weakened quickly after moving inland, falling to Category 1 status early the next day. Shortly thereafter, the system curved northward over the Nature Coast and entered Georgia on August 28, where it weakened to a tropical storm. The storm then accelerated northeastward and became extratropical over New England by August 29. The remnants traversed Atlantic Canada and much of the Atlantic Ocean before dissipating near Ireland on September 1.

The hurricane produced strong winds in the Bahamas, including a wind gust of 120 mph (190 km/h) on Bimini. A wide expanse of the east coast of Florida, stretching from Miami Beach to St. Augustine, observed hurricane-force winds, while much of the state recorded winds of at least 50 mph (80 km/h). Closer to the location of landfall, the Lake Worth Inlet observed a sustained wind speeds of 127 mph (204 km/h). Palm Beach County was one of the worst impacted areas, with 65 homes destroyed and 13,283 others damaged to some degree. Just to the north, Martin County also received extensive impact, with severe damage inflicted to about 40% of homes and commercial buildings in Stuart, where winds gusted to 160 mph (260 km/h) prior to the worst conditions. The storm generated the most severe impacts observed on Lake Okeechobee since the 1928 Okeechobee hurricane, but unlike the latter storm, did not manage to breach the local levees. Overall, the hurricane damaged about 18,000 homes, while roughly 1,000 other structures suffered severe damage or destruction in Florida. About $45 million in damage occurred in the state, which included $20 million in damage to crops, $18 million to property, $4 million electrical and communications, and $500,000 to road infrastructure.

Damage throughout the United States totaled about $52.35 million and three deaths occurred, two in Florida and one in Georgia. (Note: All monetary values are in 1949 United States dollars unless otherwise noted.)

== Meteorological history ==
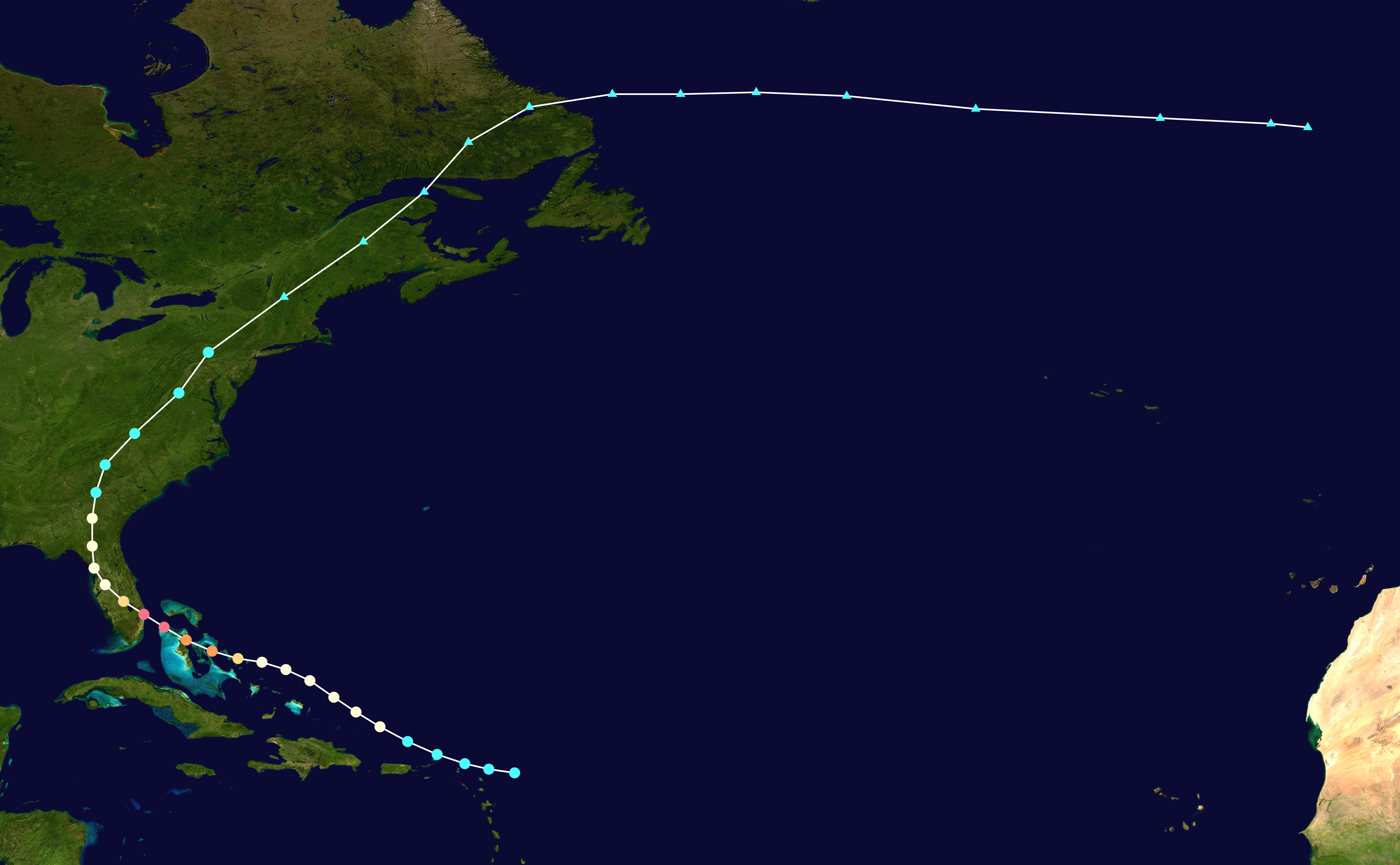
Map plotting the storm's track and intensity, according to the Saffir–Simpson scale Map key Saffir–Simpson scale Tropical depression (≤38 mph, ≤62 km/h) Tropical storm (39–73 mph, 63–118 km/h) Category 1 (74–95 mph, 119–153 km/h) Category 2 (96–110 mph, 154–177 km/h) Category 3 (111–129 mph, 178–208 km/h) Category 4 (130–156 mph, 209–251 km/h) Category 5 (≥157 mph, ≥252 km/h) Unknown Storm type Tropical cyclone Subtropical cyclone Extratropical cyclone, remnant low, tropical disturbance, or monsoon depression

At 06:00 UTC on August 23, a moderate tropical storm developed about 200 mi (320 km) east of Sint Maarten. (Operationally, the system was treated as an easterly wave until it moved through the Bahamas a few days later. The system likely originated near the Cape Verde islands, but was first observed near the Leeward Islands.) The cyclone steadily tracked west-northwestward and intensified over the succeeding three days. At 12:00 UTC on August 24, while situated north of San Juan, Puerto Rico, the tropical storm strengthened to a minimal hurricane with maximum sustained winds of 75 mph (121 km/h). Subsequently, it organized rapidly, and was "well developed" when it passed near Nassau on the morning of August 26—at that time bearing winds of 115 mph (185 km/h), equivalent to a major hurricane on the Saffir–Simpson scale. (Note: A major hurricane is a storm that ranks as Category 3 or higher on the Saffir–Simpson hurricane scale.)

Later on August 26, the storm strengthened further over the Gulf Stream, and its eye made landfall on the city of Lake Worth, Florida, at 23:00 UTC. At that time, the storm was equivalent to a Category 4 hurricane with winds of 130 mph (210 km/h). Nearby, an airport in West Palm Beach registered calm conditions and a barometric pressure of 28.17 inHg (954 mb). (Prior to reanalysis, the system was designated as a Category 3 hurricane, based on the minimum central pressure reading, which corresponded to Category 3 on the Saffir–Simpson scale. However, modern analysis applies Saffir–Simpson rankings based on maximum sustained wind speeds.) Because the eye was first encountered in Delray Beach, a short distance southward of the landfall location, the storm earned the moniker Delray Beach hurricane.

Once inland over South Florida, the hurricane moved over the northern portion of Lake Okeechobee, following a similar path to that of the 1928 Okeechobee hurricane. On August 27, the hurricane recurved over the Florida peninsula, and then weakened to a Category 1 hurricane northeast of Tampa. The system diminished to a tropical storm near Cedar Key, and entered southern Georgia during the morning of August 28. The system passed over the Carolinas as a weak tropical storm, and was operationally noted as a "weak disturbance" at the time. The cyclone passed through the Mid-Atlantic states and New England on August 29, became extratropical over New Hampshire, and was last detected over the North Atlantic Ocean near Ireland on September 1.

== Preparations and impact ==
On August 25, the northern Bahamas were advised to initiate hurricane precautions, and a hurricane warning was issued for the islands. South Floridians were encouraged to closely monitor the progress of the storm. On August 26, hurricane warnings were released from Miami to Vero Beach; officials decided to cancel proposed evacuations of the Lake Okeechobee region, as the presence of the Herbert Hoover Dike was expected to prevent flooding.

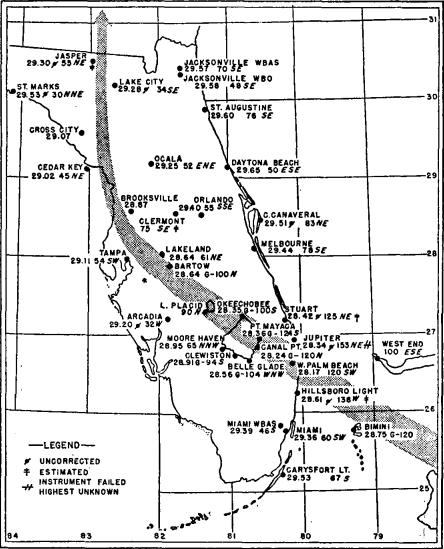
Map of wind and pressure observations in Florida during the hurricane

The cities of Jupiter, Palm Beach, Stuart, and West Palm Beach experienced the most severe damage from the storm in South Florida. A damage assessment conducted in 22 counties indicated that approximately 18,000 homes suffered damage, while roughly 1,000 other structures were severely damaged or destroyed. The cyclone inflicted heavy citrus losses, and one-third of the trees were uprooted in many groves. Agricultural damage reached $20 million, with about 14 million boxes of fruit lost. Overall, the state suffered roughly $45 million in damage, which included $20 million in damage to crops, $18 million to property, $4 million electrical and communications, and $500,000 to road infrastructure. Only two deaths occurred in Florida, which was attributed to advance warnings. Water entered many homes in Palm Beach and Martin counties, causing snakes and mosquitoes to infest residences. Precipitation totals of 8.18 in (208 mm), 7.1 in (180 mm), and 9.51 in (242 mm) were measured at Belle Glade, Okeechobee, and St. Lucie Lock, respectively. The cyclone produced hurricane-force gusts in Florida from Miami Beach to Saint Augustine; the majority of the state experienced sustained winds of at least 50 mph (80 km/h). The strongest winds were observed between northern Broward County and St. Lucie County, as well as around Lake Okeechobee. Many locations in this region of the state recorded sustained winds over 100 mph (160 km/h), while a few sites measured wind gusts of 140 mph (230 km/h) or higher.

=== The Bahamas ===
In the Bahamas, the cyclone produced 120 mph (190 km/h) wind gusts on Bimini. Damages in the Bahamas are unknown.

=== Coastal South Florida ===
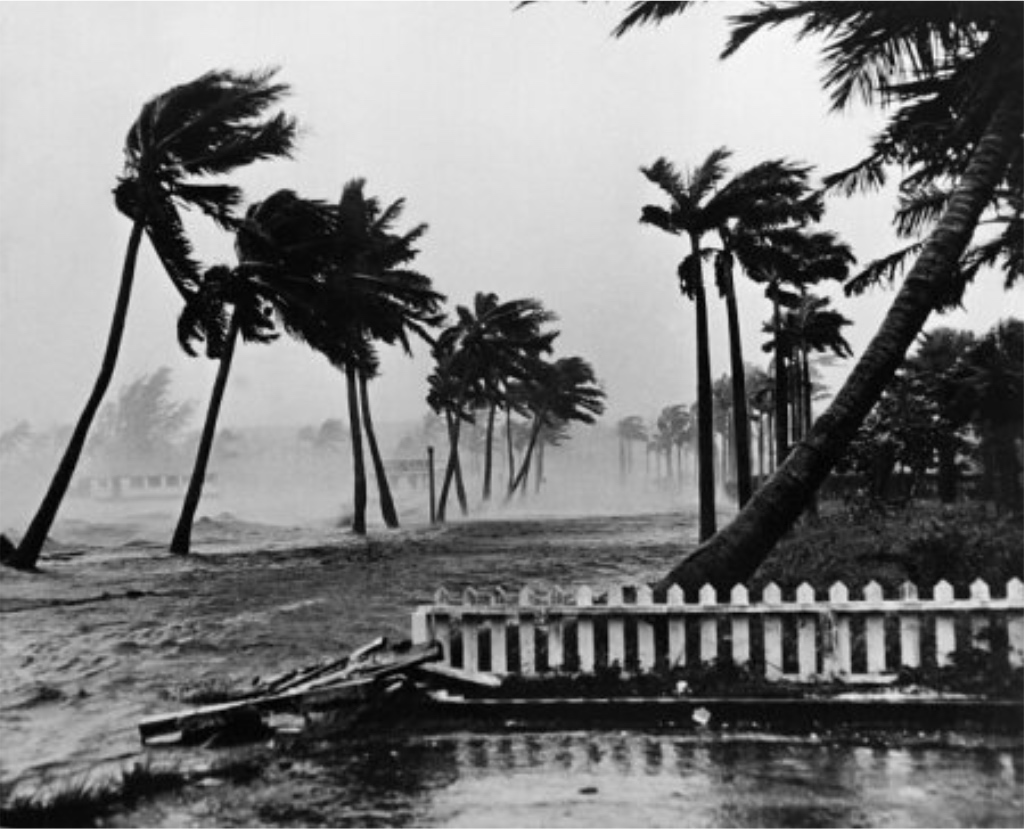
Storm surge and strong winds in Palm Beach during the hurricane

In West Palm Beach, peak gusts of 125 mph (201 km/h) were recorded before the anemometer blew away. A maximum sustained wind of 153 mph (246 km/h) was reported from the Jupiter Inlet Light prior to the loss of the anemometer; although conditions were slightly more severe after the reading, reliable estimates are unavailable, and the highest observed reading was recorded above the standard elevation of 10 m (33 ft). Nevertheless, the observation from Jupiter marked the highest officially registered wind speed in Florida during the storm. The strongest sustained wind speed at standard height was 127 mph (204 km/h) at the Lake Worth Inlet.

In Miami, winds reached up to 54 mph (87 km/h). Impact in the city and Miami Beach was primarily limited to minor damage to signs, plants, and trees. One death occurred in the city when a man drowned in Biscayne Bay while swimming to moor a small boat. The strongest sustained winds speed in Fort Lauderdale was 80 mph (130 km/h), while gusts peaked at 100 mph (160 km/h). Many signs, trees, and shrubbery were damaged, with a number of trees falling onto streets. A possible tornado downed several coconut palm trees on U.S. Route 1. Several plate glass windows at downtown businesses were shattered. Heavy rainfall flooded many intersections and streets in low-lying and poor drainage areas of the city. The hurricane demolished three homes in Pompano Beach, while part of an apartment complex was severely damaged. Additionally, store and restaurant fronts and their roofs also suffered damage. Winds toppled 15 electrical poles on State Road 811. Throughout Broward County, 150 homes were destroyed and 150 others suffered damage.

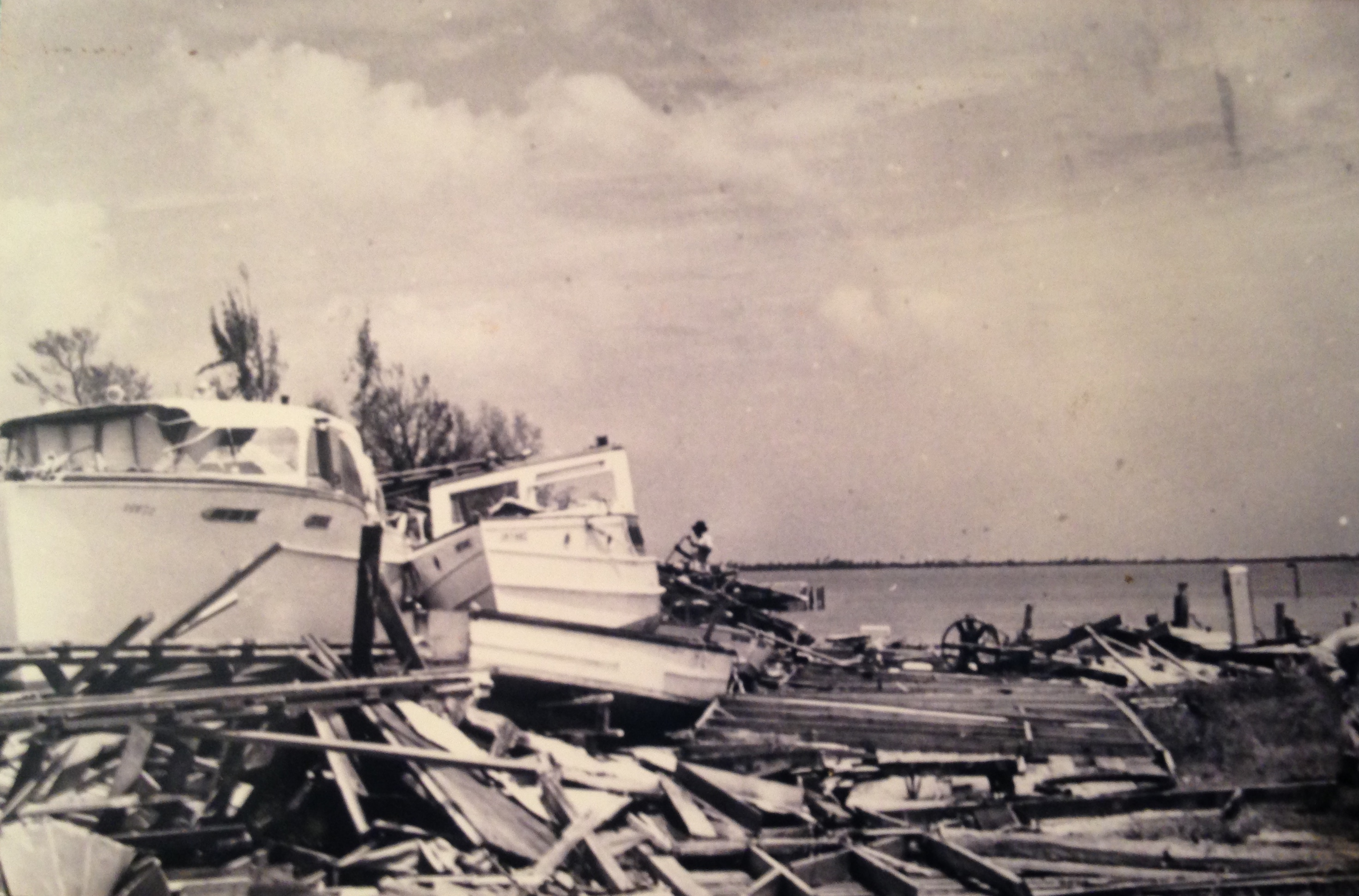
Boats on top of debris in the wake of the hurricane in Florida

Communications were mostly disrupted in Boca Raton. A number of homes experienced structural impacts in Delray Beach, with five homes being destroyed, while many businesses received major damage. In Boynton Beach, extensive impact was incurred shrubbery, trees, and property. Several structures were deroofed. The bridge across the Intracoastal Waterway was left impassable. The "negro section" of Boynton Beach suffered $10,000 in damage, which included extensive damage to stores. Tides lashed the coast, with the worst impact between Lake Worth and Palm Beach. Much of the island of Palm Beach was covered with power lines, trees, broken glass, sand, and other debris. Between Joseph E. Widener's mansion in Palm Beach and the Lake Worth casino, several washouts were reported. Along State Road 704 (Royal Palm Way), many royal palm trees were toppled. At the Society of the Four Arts, several trees were uprooted and the library garden was ruined. The radio antenna at the town hall collapsed, damaging the roof, police and firefighters barracks, the door to the fire station, and a car. Palm Beach suffered approximately $2.6 million in damage. In Lake Worth, a total of about 400 people stayed at six shelters in the area during the storm. Between 300 and 400 homes were impacted by the storm, with most of the effects limited to broken roofs, shattered windows, and water damage. One home was completely demolished. This does not include the number of homes deroofed in the "negro quarters". Additionally, a trailer was overturned and "rolled over and over like a rubber ball". Many plate-glass windows broke in the business district, while a filling station on State Road 802 was destroyed. Three of the four radio towers in the city were toppled. In West Palm Beach, cars were overturned in the interior of a dealership as winds shattered windows. At the Palm Beach International Airport, some hangars collapsed, causing 16 planes to be destroyed and 5 others be affected. Additionally, 15 C-46s suffered damage. Almost $1 million in damage occurred at the airport alone. Nearby, several warehouses which stored cars experienced roof cave-ins, crushing a number of vehicles. Several homes near the airport were deroofed. A shelter was deroofed, forcing the Red Cross and National Guard to evacuate about 60 people. Another shelter suffered wind and water damage, resulting in about 200 people moving to a different part of the building. A 196 ft (60 m) radio tower owned by WJNO fell into the Intracostal Water. Nearby, storm surge flooded a hotel lobby with 6 in (150 mm) of water, while winds damaged its glass dome. Approximately 2,000 homes out of about 7,000 in the city were damaged. It was estimated that the hurricane caused more than $4 million in damage in West Palm Beach. In Riviera Beach, two stores were destroyed, while about 50 businesses and 500 homes sustained damage. Throughout Palm Beach County, the storm destroyed 65 homes and damaged 13,283 others.

=== Lake Okeechobee ===
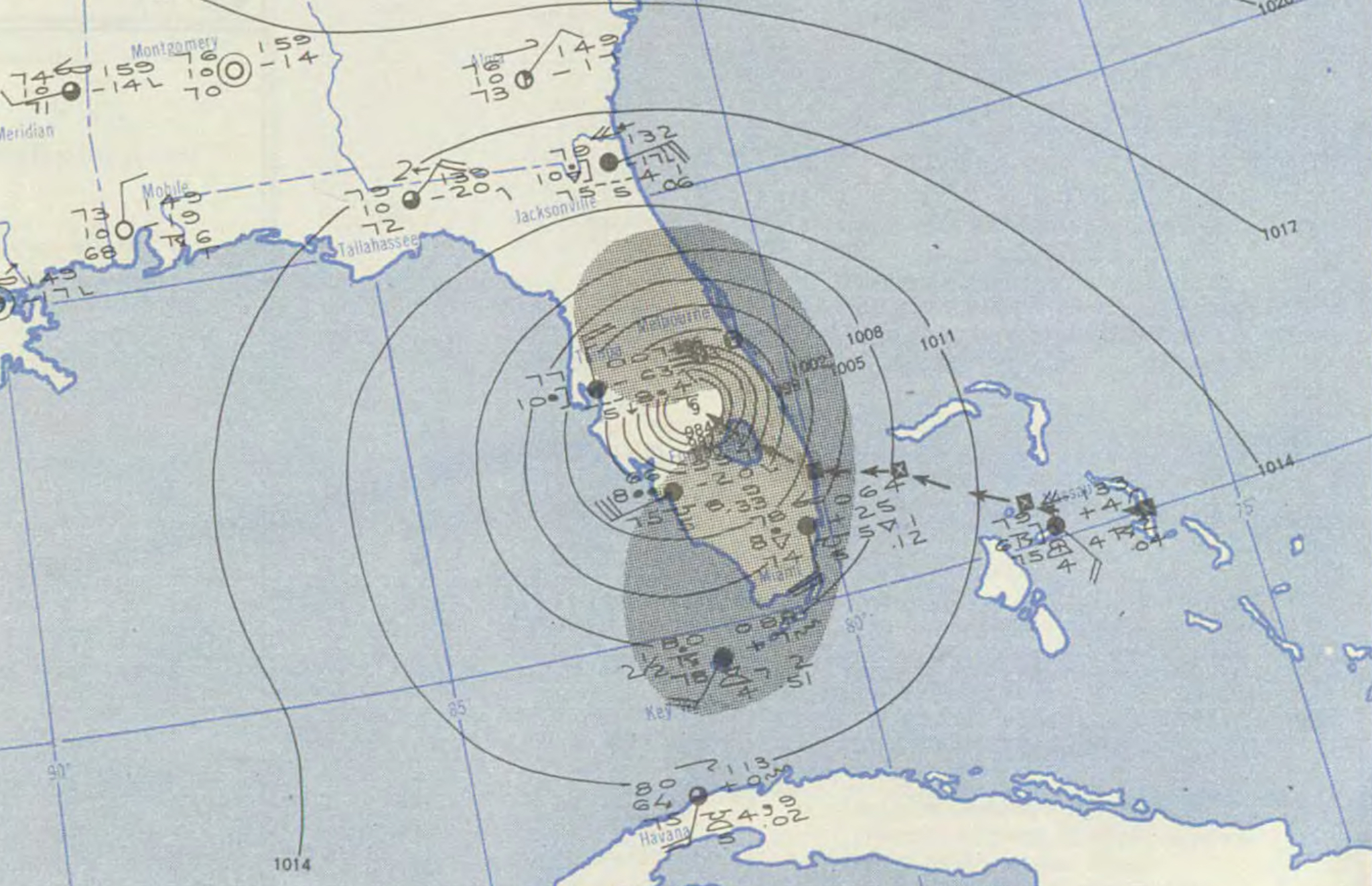
Weather map of the hurricane over Florida on August 27

The hurricane was one of the most severe on record over Lake Okeechobee, and the strongest on record there since September 1928. Sustained winds at Belle Glade peaked at 100 mph (160 km/h) and wind gusts reached 140 mph (230 km/h) before the anemometer blew away. A number of power lines and trees were downed, while the WSWN radio station tower fell. At the state prison, the roof of an implement shed collapsed, destroying about $50,000 worth of equipment. Additionally, two barns were demolished and the dining hall, dormitories, and a parking garage were inflicted damage. Damage in the city was estimated at more than $1 million. Tides reached 12 ft (144 in) above normal at Belle Glade and Clewiston and the Lake Okeechobee area was lashed with winds of at least 122 mph (196 km/h) for about seven hours, but the Herbert Hoover Dike remained intact, protecting the area from severe flooding. Minimal erosion occurred in some locales. Significant damage was reported in Pahokee and communications were knocked out completely.

=== Treasure Coast ===
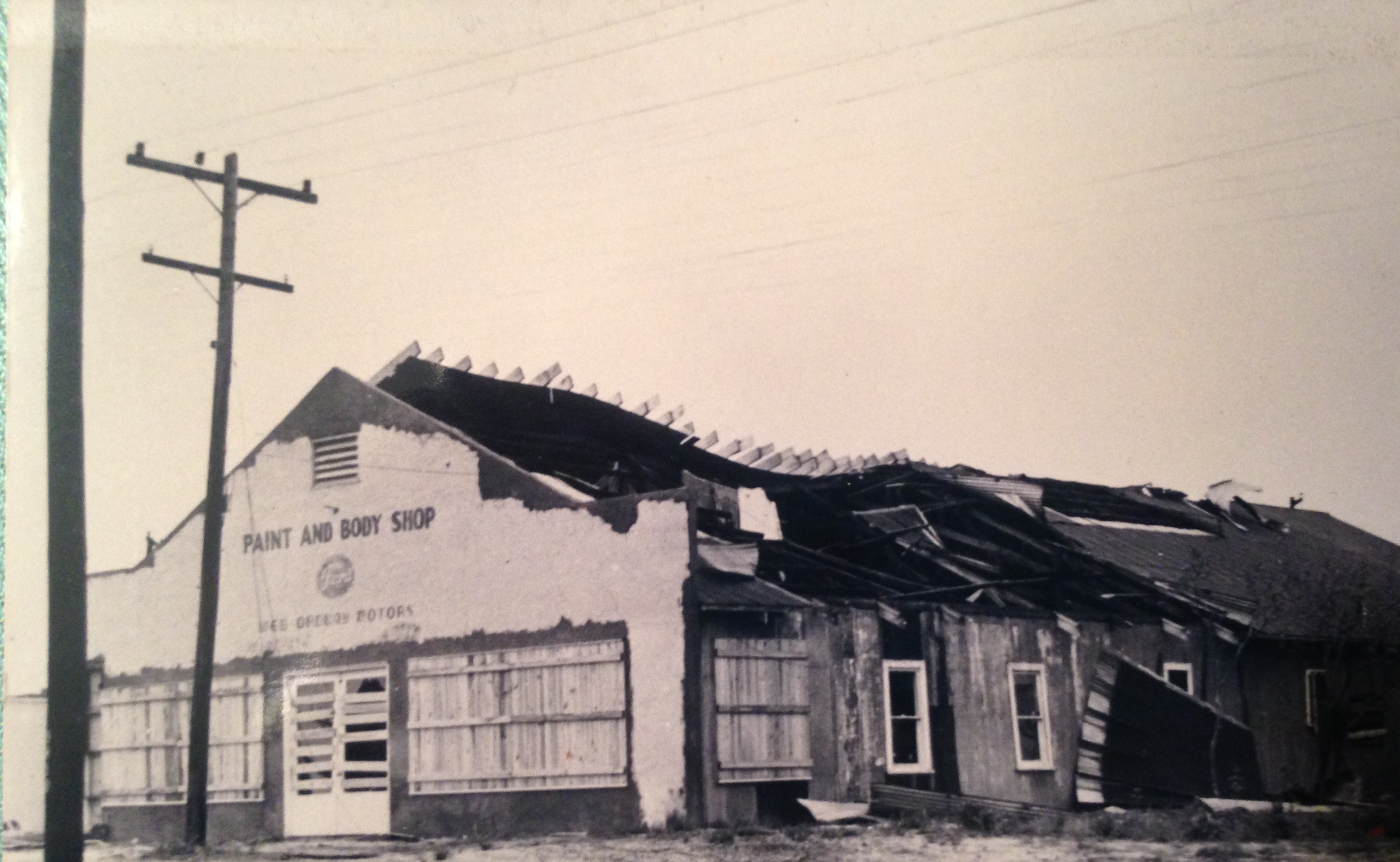
Roof torn off from a building in Stuart from the hurricane

In the Treasure Coast region, a wind gust unofficially reached 160 mph (260 km/h) at Stuart, as measured by a rooftop anemometer at a fire station, but instrumentation was disabled prior to the worst conditions. About 40% of homes in Stuart and commercial structures were severely damaged, while 90% of structures required repairs. A church, baseball park, and ice company was destroyed in the area's black neighborhoods. Many flimsy buildings were destroyed in the neighborhoods. Three portions of the Jensen causeway near Sewall's Point were ripped away. A hangar and beacon was destroyed at the local airport in Martin County. About 500 people were homeless in Stuart. A water mark of 8.5 ft (102 in) was recorded on the St. Lucie River near Stuart. In Fort Pierce, winds of 100 mph (160 km/h) were reported.

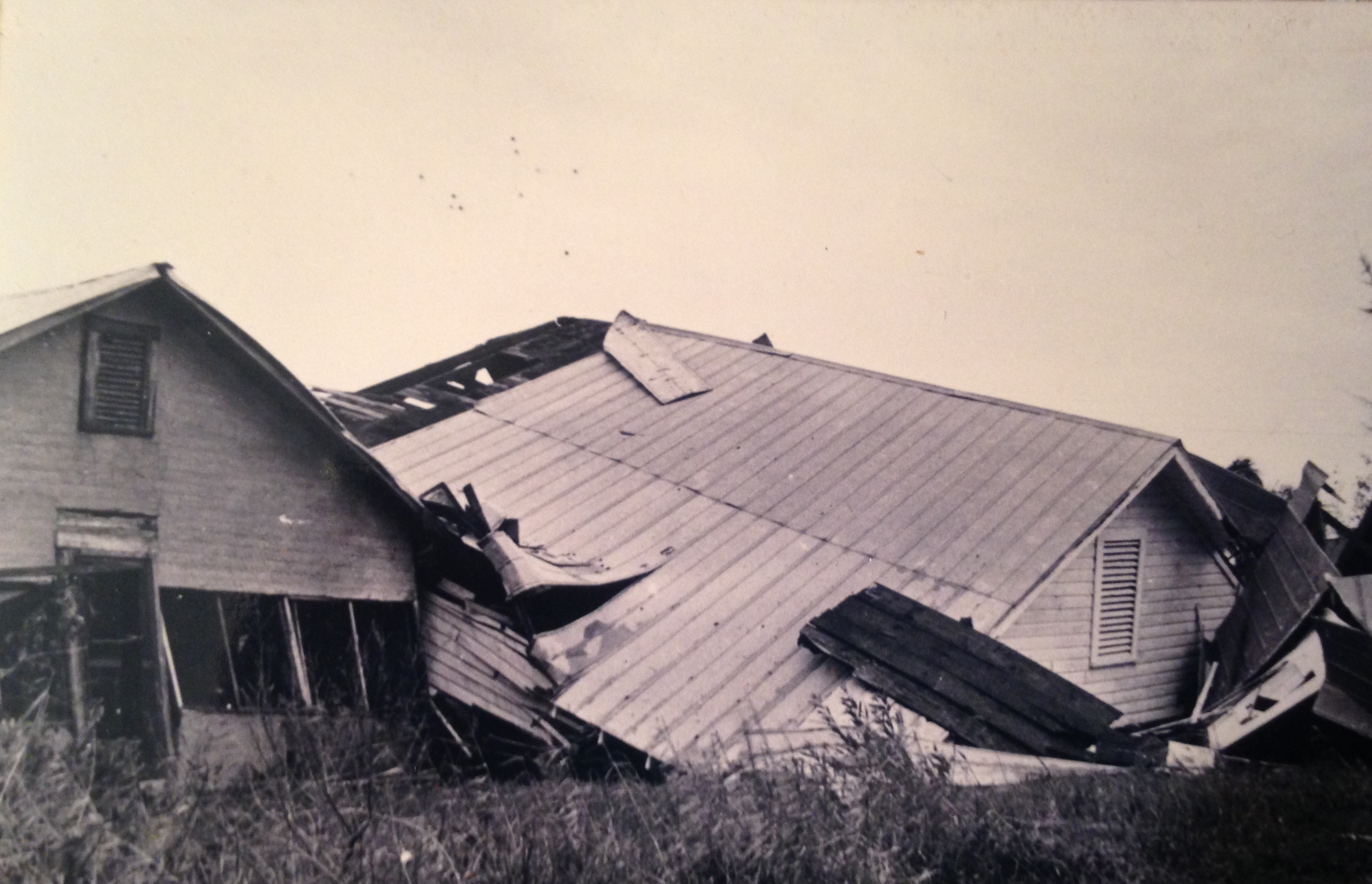
A collapsed house in Florida after the hurricane

Trees, electrical poles, and power lines littered the streets, with nearly the entire city losing electricity. A hotel was deroofed and many businesses suffered substantial damage. Officials noted that every home suffered some degree of damage. The Indian River overflowed, flooding the city with millions of gallons of water. The hurricane destroyed 35 homes and damaged 3,300 others. Vero Beach reported sustained winds of 97 mph (156 km/h) and peak gusts of 110 mph (180 km/h). A man was injured in Vero Beach while attempting to operate a pump in the midst of hurricane-force winds; he succumbed to his injuries at a hospital in Palm Beach about two weeks later. The hurricane damaged approximately 1,000 homes throughout Indian River County.

=== Central Florida and beyond ===
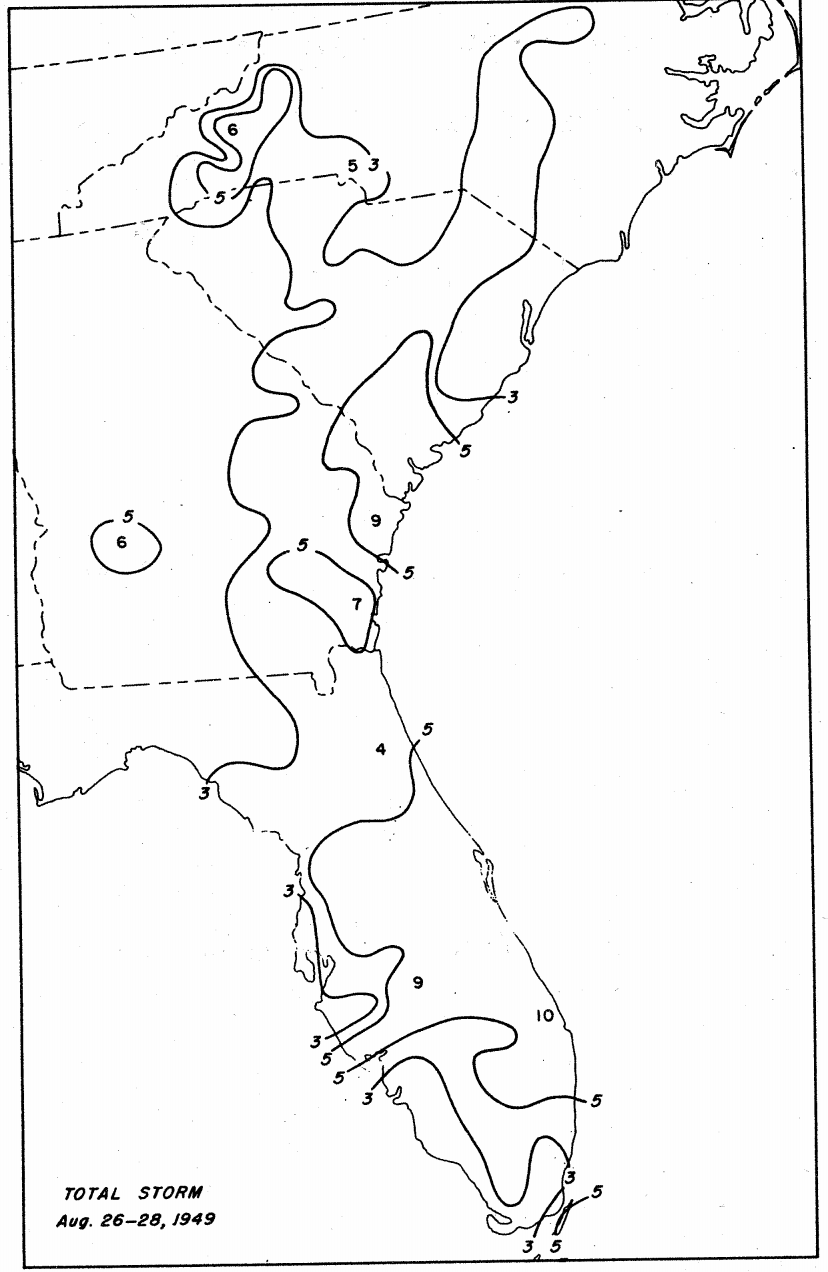
Total precipitation from the 1949 Florida hurricane

A total of 50 homes in Manatee County were damaged by the storm. Numerous Central Florida communities also reported severe damage from the winds. The observation station at Archbold Biological Station reported peak wind gusts of 110 mph (180 km/h); the town of Sebring reported 125 mph (201 km/h) gusts, which caused damage to trees and severe structural damage to buildings. Estimations of property damage reached $100,000 in the town, and local citrus groves estimated losses near $2 million. Buildings received considerable damage in the Lake Placid area, and telegraph, telephone, rail, and bus services were disrupted. Throughout Highlands County, a total of 14 homes were destroyed and 165 others received damage. At the Weather Bureau office in Lakeland, the anemometer recorded sustained winds of 61 mph (98 km/h) and gusts reaching 75 mph (121 km/h). Nearly the entire city lost electricity and telephone service experienced significant interruptions. A number of electrical poles and wires fell, while fallen palm and oak trees blocked at least a dozen streets. At the Munn Park Historic District, winds shattered at least six storefront plate glass windows, uprooted hundreds of trees, and detached large advertising billboards from their anchors. A brick building housing six storage units was nearly destroyed. Throughout Lakeland, hundreds of homes were partially or completely deroofed. In Orlando, the executive airport (then known as Orlando Air Force Base) observed sustained winds of 55 mph (89 km/h) and gusts up to 84 mph (135 km/h). Property damage in the city was generally light, though signs, trees, and power lines fell, causing some power outages. Several streets were blocked by falling trees, but most obstructions of the roads were quickly cleared. At Orlando Air Force Base, the storm felled about 25 trees and left some roof damage to buildings with tar-paper roofs. Wind gusts of 75 mph (121 km/h) affected Clermont. Fifty homes in Lake County experienced some degree of damage.

In Alabama, a strong thunderstorm on the fringes of the hurricane damaged several airplanes, interrupted electrical services, and injured four people in Birmingham. Flooding affected Georgia and the Carolinas, although the rains alleviated drought conditions in Maryland, Pennsylvania, New York, and New England. In Georgia, a young boy was electrocuted by a downed power line near Savannah. Charleston, South Carolina, reported a wind gust of 80 mph (130 km/h), and power lines were damaged. In Maryland, damage was minimal, although trees were prostrated and electrical services were down. Throughout the United States, the hurricane caused two deaths and about $52.35 million in damage.

== See also ==
- 1928 Okeechobee hurricane – Another Category 4 hurricane that struck Palm Beach County
- 1933 Treasure Coast hurricane – Struck northernmost Palm Beach County as a Category 3
- List of Florida hurricanes
  - List of Florida hurricanes (1900–1949)

== Sources ==
- Barnes, Jay (1998). Florida's Hurricane History (1st ed.). Chapel Hill, North Carolina: UNC Press. ISBN 0-8078-2443-7 – via Internet Archive.
- Bush, David M.; Neal, William J.; Longo, Norma J.; et al. (2004). Pilkey, Orrin H.; Neal, William J. (eds.). Living with Florida's Atlantic Beaches: Coastal Hazards from Amelia Island to Key West. Living with the Shore. Durham, North Carolina: Duke University Press. ISBN 978-0-822-33289-3.
- Duedall, Iver W.; Williams, John M. (2002) [1997]. Florida Hurricanes and Tropical Storms, 1871–2001 (2nd ed.). Gainesville, Florida: University Press of Florida. ISBN 0-8130-2494-3 – via Internet Archive.
- Jarrell, Jeremy D.; Hebert, Paul J.; Mayfield, Max (1992) [1984]. Hurricane Experience Levels of Coastal County Populations from Texas to Maine (PDF) (Technical report). NOAA Technical Memorandum. Coral Gables, Florida: National Oceanic and Atmospheric Administration. p. 4. NWS-NHC 46. Archived from the original (PDF) on 12 October 2008.
- Landsea, Christopher; Glenn, David A.; Bredemeyer, William; et al. (2007). "A Reanalysis of the 1911–20 Atlantic Hurricane Database". Journal of Climate. 21 (10) (published 15 May 2008): 2138–2168. Bibcode:2008JCli...21.2138L. doi:10.1175/2007jcli1119.1. S2CID 1785238. Archived (PDF) from the original on 1 November 2008.
- Norton, Grady (August 1949). Written at Miami. "Hurricane of August, 1949". Special Weather Summary. Climatological Data. Florida. 53 (8). Chattanooga, Tennessee: National Climatic Data Center (published 1949): 128.
- Schloemer, Robert W. (March 1954). Analysis and Synthesis of Hurricane Wind Patterns over Lake Okeechobee, Florida (PDF) (Technical report). Hydrometeorological Report. Washington, D.C.: United States Weather Bureau (published May 1954). p. 3. 31.
- Schoner, R. W.; Molansky, S. (July 1956). "Storms in the south Atlantic coastal region". Storm of August 23–9, 1949 (PDF) (Technical report). National Hurricane Research Project. Washington, D.C.: United States Weather Bureau. pp. 214–5. 3, Rainfall Associated with Hurricanes – via Weather Prediction Center.
- Zoch, Richmond T. (December 1949). "North Atlantic Hurricanes and Tropical Disturbances of 1949" (PDF). United States Weather Bureau (FTP). Washington, D.C. p. 339. Bibcode:1949MWRv...77..339Z. doi:10.1175/1520-0493(1949)077<0339:NAHATD>2.0.CO;2. (To view documents see Help:FTP)
