= 1903 Florida hurricane =

Category 1 Atlantic hurricane in 1903

Hurricane Three 1903 Inchulva hurricane
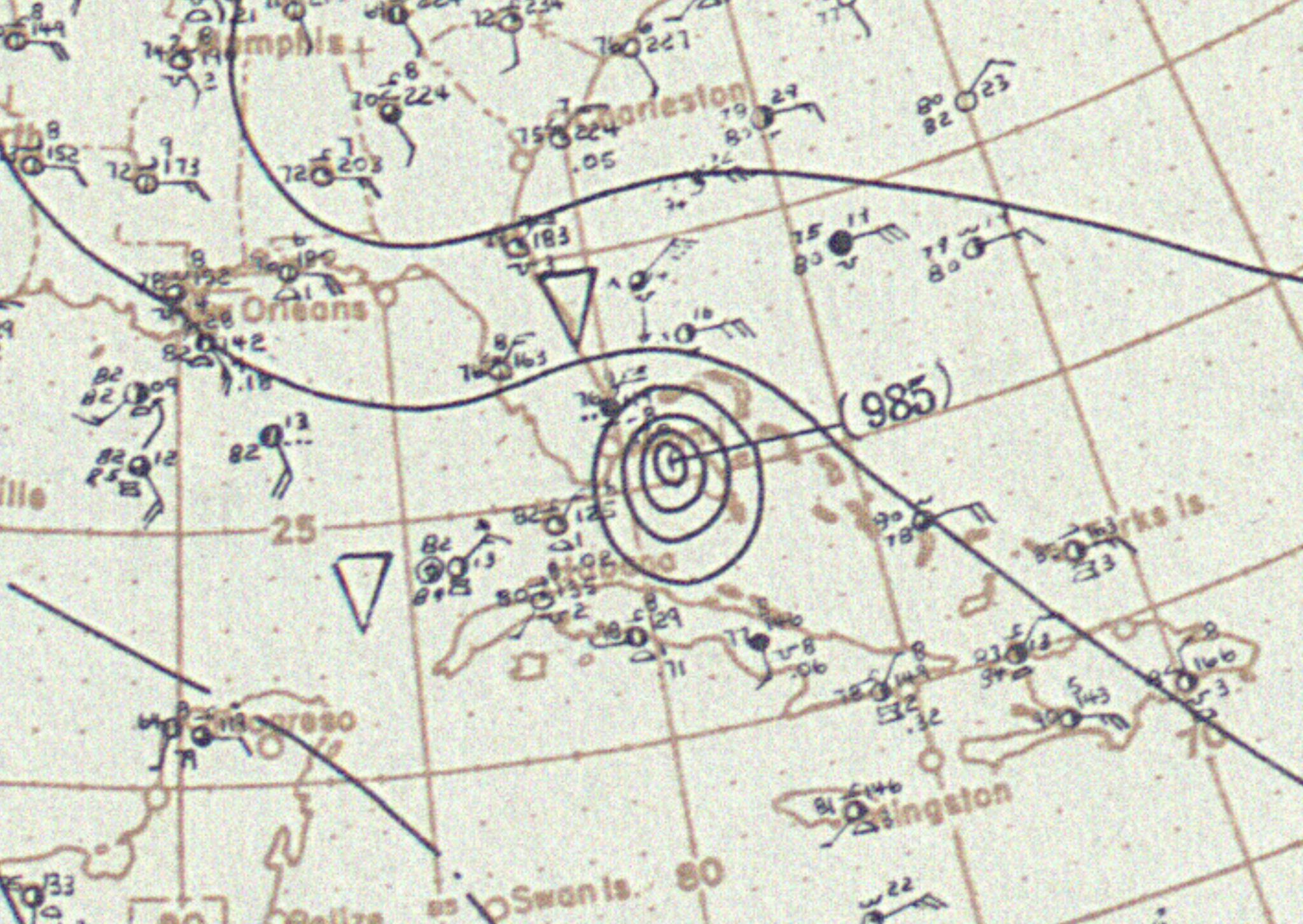
- Surface weather analysis of the hurricane nearing South Florida on September 11

Meteorological history
- Formed: September 9, 1903
- Dissipated: September 16, 1903

Category 1 hurricane
- 1-minute sustained (SSHWS/NWS)
- Highest winds: 90 mph (150 km/h)
- Lowest pressure: 976 mbar (hPa); 28.82 inHg

Overall effects
- Fatalities: 14 direct
- Damage: $500,000 (1903 USD)($17.5 million in 2024 USD)
- Areas affected: British Bahamas; Florida; Alabama; Georgia
- IBTrACS
- Part of the 1903 Atlantic hurricane season

The 1903 Florida hurricane, also known as the Inchulva hurricane, was a moderate Atlantic hurricane that caused extensive wind and flood damage in peninsular Florida and over the adjourning Southeastern United States in early to mid September 1903. The third tropical cyclone and third hurricane of the season, this storm was first observed near the Turks and Caicos Islands early on September 9. Moving northwestward, it became a hurricane the next day and passed near Nassau, The Bahamas. The cyclone then turned to the west-northwest on September 11 and passed just north of Bimini. As it crossed the Bahamas, the cyclone produced rainbands with hurricane-force winds and downpours, moderately damaging crops and buildings but inflicting no deaths over the island chain.

The cyclone then struck near Fort Lauderdale, Florida, causing severe wind damage across the Gold Coast, although most losses were to crops such as sugarcane. The steamship Inchulva capsized near Delray Beach, drowning nine crew members. The cyclone weakened to a tropical storm while crossing Florida, but re-intensified into a hurricane over the Gulf of Mexico on September 13. Hours later the storm made landfall near present-day Panama City, Florida. In Northwest Florida, Alabama, and Georgia, the cyclone produced widespread rainfall, causing some crop damage. Additionally, a storm surge caused boats to be blown ashore in the Florida panhandle. In all, the storm killed 14 people in Florida and produced $500,000 in damage. After falling to tropical storm intensity early on September 14, the storm weakened to a tropical depression on September 16, several hours before dissipating over South Carolina. (Note: All damage totals are in 1903 United States dollars unless otherwise noted.)

== Meteorological history ==
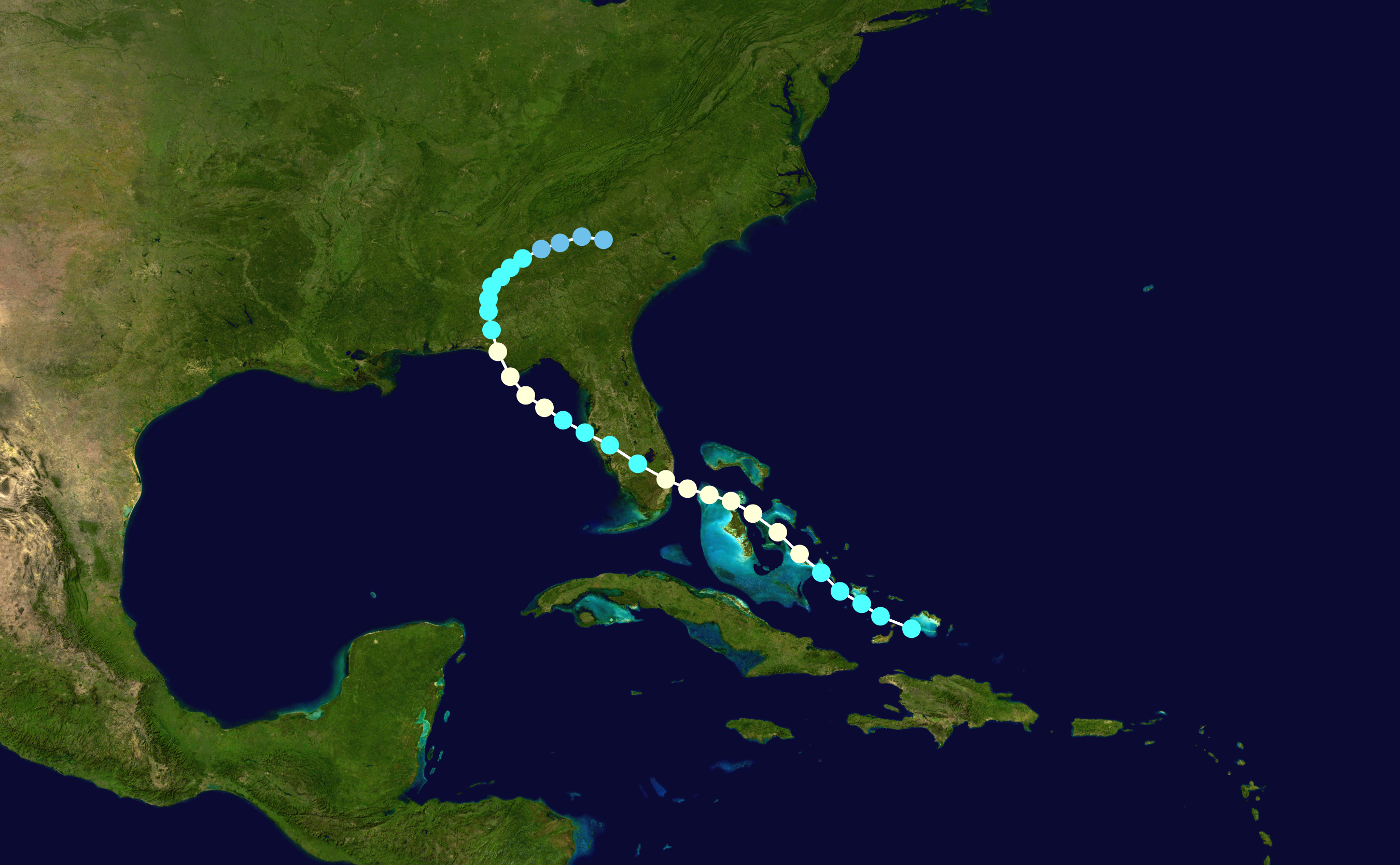
Map plotting the storm's track and intensity, according to the Saffir–Simpson scale Map key Saffir–Simpson scale Tropical depression (≤38 mph, ≤62 km/h) Tropical storm (39–73 mph, 63–118 km/h) Category 1 (74–95 mph, 119–153 km/h) Category 2 (96–110 mph, 154–177 km/h) Category 3 (111–129 mph, 178–208 km/h) Category 4 (130–156 mph, 209–251 km/h) Category 5 (≥157 mph, ≥252 km/h) Unknown Storm type Tropical cyclone Subtropical cyclone Extratropical cyclone, remnant low, tropical disturbance, or monsoon depression

Based on research by the Atlantic hurricane reanalysis project in 2003, the cyclone is first noted in the Atlantic hurricane database (HURDAT) as a moderate tropical storm about 15 mi (25 km) south-southeast of West Caicos in the Turks and Caicos Islands—an island group in the southeastern Lucayan Archipelago—on September 9; however, due to sparse observations, its genesis likely occurred earlier than listed but was undetected operationally. Moving slowly northwest, the cyclone quickly strengthened into a hurricane with sustained winds of 75 mph (120 km/h), equivalent to Category 1 on the Saffir–Simpson scale, a day later. On September 11, it attained its initial peak of 85 mph (140 km/h) while about 10 mi (15 km) west-northwest of New Providence Island in the Bahamas. Turning to the west-northwest, the cyclone maintained its intensity while passing just north of Bimini. Around 23:00 UTC, the cyclone struck South Florida near Fort Lauderdale. Thereafter, the hurricane weakened upon crossing the Everglades, diminishing to a tropical storm early on September 12.

Shortly afterward, the cyclone entered the Gulf of Mexico near Egmont Key, in the Tampa Bay area, with winds of 60 mph (95 km/h). Then it quickly began to restrengthen, regaining hurricane status the following day while centered about 100 mi (160 km) south of St. Marks in the Big Bend of Florida. As it neared the Florida panhandle the storm curved to the northwest, increased its forward speed, and acquired its secondary peak of 90 mph (150 km/h). The hurricane passed just west of Cape San Blas, but did not strike there. As its heading backed to the north-northwest, the cyclone made landfall just east of Panama City around 23:00 UTC. Moving inland, the cyclone decelerated dramatically and lost hurricane intensity, weakening further as it entered southern Alabama early on September 14. The next day, its trajectory gradually veered eastward, and on September 16, it degenerated into a tropical depression. Less than 24 hours later, the system dissipated just east of the Georgia–South Carolina border.

== Preparations and impact ==
Bahamians received no advance notice of the storm, due to scarce ship and other reports. On September 10, the United States Weather Bureau issued storm signals, equivalent to a tropical storm warning in 2024, from Cedar Key, Florida, to Charleston, South Carolina. These were later upgraded to hurricane warnings in South Florida. Due to inclement weather conditions in West Palm Beach, which had been newly incorporated as a town just days earlier, businesses suspended their normal operations and people boarded up buildings, even as the strongest winds arrived. As the cyclone moved into the Gulf of Mexico, reports from September 12 through September 14 helped ships prepare for the storm.

In the Bahamas, the eye of the storm passed over Cat Cay, accompanied by a barometric reading of 28.82 inHg (976 mb), the lowest measured in the archipelago and in the storm itself. Only 0.84 inches (21 mm) of rain attended the passage of the hurricane on the island, but up to 6 3/4 in (170 mm) drenched the capital Nassau, on New Providence Island. A weather station there recorded winds of 60 mph (97 km/h), shortly before the anemometer blew away, after which peak velocities were estimated to be 90 mph (140 km/h). Citywide the winds flattened small dwellings, along with telephone and telegraph lines, sheds, barriers, and fruit crops (mainly grapefruit and orange). Larger buildings received lesser damage, mainly to exteriors such as roof slates and verandas. Flash floods, along with the rains, soaked building interiors, ruining goods and filling streets to depths of several feet. The storm also snarled local shipping.

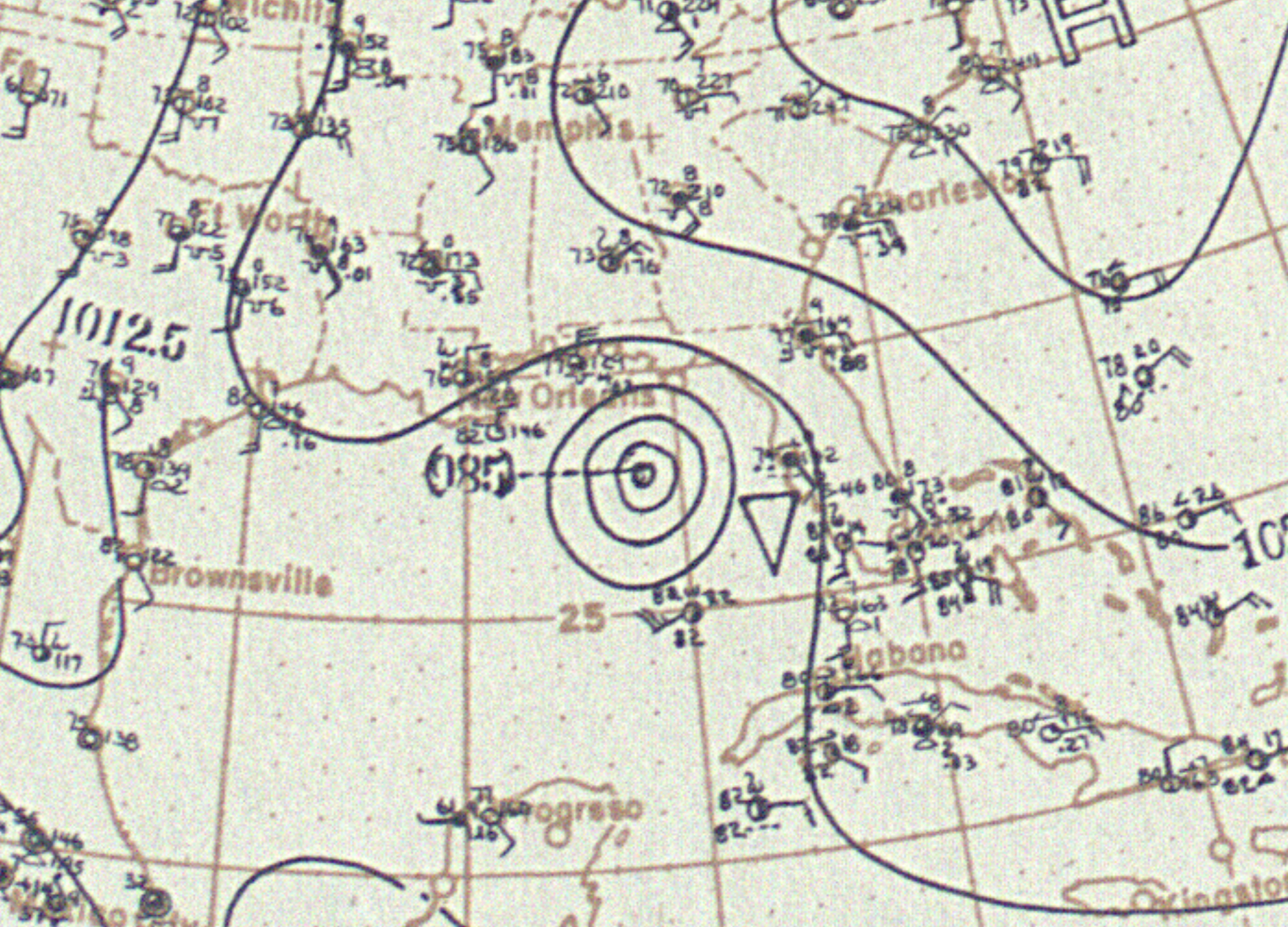
Synoptic weather map of the hurricane over the northeastern Gulf of Mexico, nearing landfall in the Florida Panhandle on September 13

In southeast Florida, no meteorological observations were available within 50 mi (80 km) of the eye. However, the cyclone produced sustained winds of 84 mph (135 km/h) at Jupiter, which was near the edge of the larger-than-average center. Winds of damaging force extended 30 mi (50 km) north of Jupiter, with most damage centered on areas farther south. Only pineapple sheds were damaged at Jupiter, along with others in nearby Stuart, where the storm also shifted a house, razed an outbuilding, and beached a racing yacht. The winds also downed about a dozen power poles in Jupiter. In West Palm Beach, many buildings were unroofed, while rainfall and winds subsequently caused further damage to their interiors, such as at The Tropical Sun office building, the Seminole Hotel, the Palms Hotel, Schmid's Commercial Hotel, and properties owned by former mayor Marion E. Gruber. Several other businesses suffered similar damage. Debris such as roofing scraps, tree branches, paper, and driftwood was thrown into the streets. In the African American section of the town, several buildings were destroyed, including three of the four churches. Damage there ran "way up in the thousands", according to the Tropical Sun. Hotels on the nearby island of Palm Beach survived, but many coconut palms and other vegetation were prostrated. Coconut trees and shrubbery were also toppled on Munyon Island. All three of the cottages were blown into the Lake Worth Lagoon, while the hotel also suffered some damage.

In Boynton Beach dozens of homes were damaged to some degree. Fruit crops including guava, lemons, and lime littered the ground, while pineapple fields were flattened. Power and telegraph lines and trees, including many large pines, were toppled throughout the city. The settlements of Pompano, where the eye was believed to have come ashore, and Delray Beach were nearly annihilated; trees were defoliated and many buildings dismantled. At Pompano the two-story McNab home was leveled, along with a well-built packing house. Damage in the Miami area was mainly confined to small buildings overturned, trees uprooted, smokestacks downed, and metal items—such as awnings and roofs—broken or scattered. Only two or three homes were blown off their foundations in the northern part of the area. At the new Miami Metropolis building, the wall on the west side collapsed. Telegraph and electrical lines were downed throughout the city, leaving dense tangles in streets. The loss of electricity was restored by the night of September 12. Damage in South Florida reached $100,000, mainly to crops such as sugarcane in the Everglades.

The cyclone generated rough seas near the point of impact in South Florida, including an 8-foot (2.4 m) storm surge at Jupiter. On the west shoreline of Lake Worth Lagoon, homes were swept off their foundations and their interiors flooded. The Lake Worth News building in Lake Worth was severely damaged by flooding. The storm wrecked many vessels along the Florida east coast between Hobe Sound and Miami, including 12 or more in the Fort Lauderdale–West Palm Beach area. All but three watercraft on the Lake Worth Lagoon foundered. About 9 mi (14 km) south of Jupiter, the schooner Martha T. Thomas was blown ashore, without loss of crew members, and a Standard Oil barge was bashed against a reef off Boynton Beach, forcing its crew of 11 to swim ashore. Offshore of Delray Beach, the 400-foot-long (120 m) British steamship Inchulva, laden with wheat, wrecked near the Orange Grove House of Refuge. Of the 28 crew members, nine drowned as the ship stranded and broke apart just 200 yd (180 m) off the beach. The wreck was later salvaged and transformed into an underwater diving attraction.

In Central Florida, the cyclone only caused minor damage to structures and blew down trees, but at least two people died in Tampa. The storm also damaged businesses in the area and reportedly blew down half the local orange crop. Heavy rainfall occurred along the path, peaking at 14 1/2 in (370 mm) in Fort Meade. In the Florida panhandle, the hurricane produced a pressure of 29.08 inHg (985 mb) and winds up to 80 mph (130 km/h) on St. Andrews Bay. The peak storm surge was measured at up to 10 ft (3.0 m) in the town of Apalachicola. Up to 50% of the cotton crop was destroyed, but overall structural damage was minor, though ships were grounded near Apalachicola. As the cyclone moved inland over Alabama and Georgia on September 14–15, it produced widespread rains peaking at 5.42 in (138 mm) in Griffin, Georgia. Minor crop damage occurred in low-lying areas, but advance warning reduced the potential damage. Overall, the hurricane killed 14 people, all in Florida, and caused $500,000 in losses.

== See also ==
- 1932 Florida–Alabama hurricane — Followed a similar track across South Florida
- Hurricane Erin (1995) — Roughly paralleled the 1903 hurricane
- Hurricane Five (1936) — Also mimicked the previous storms
- List of Florida hurricanes (1900–49)
