= Delray Wreck =

Site (in Delray Beach, Florida, U.S.) of the sinking of the steamship SS Inchulva

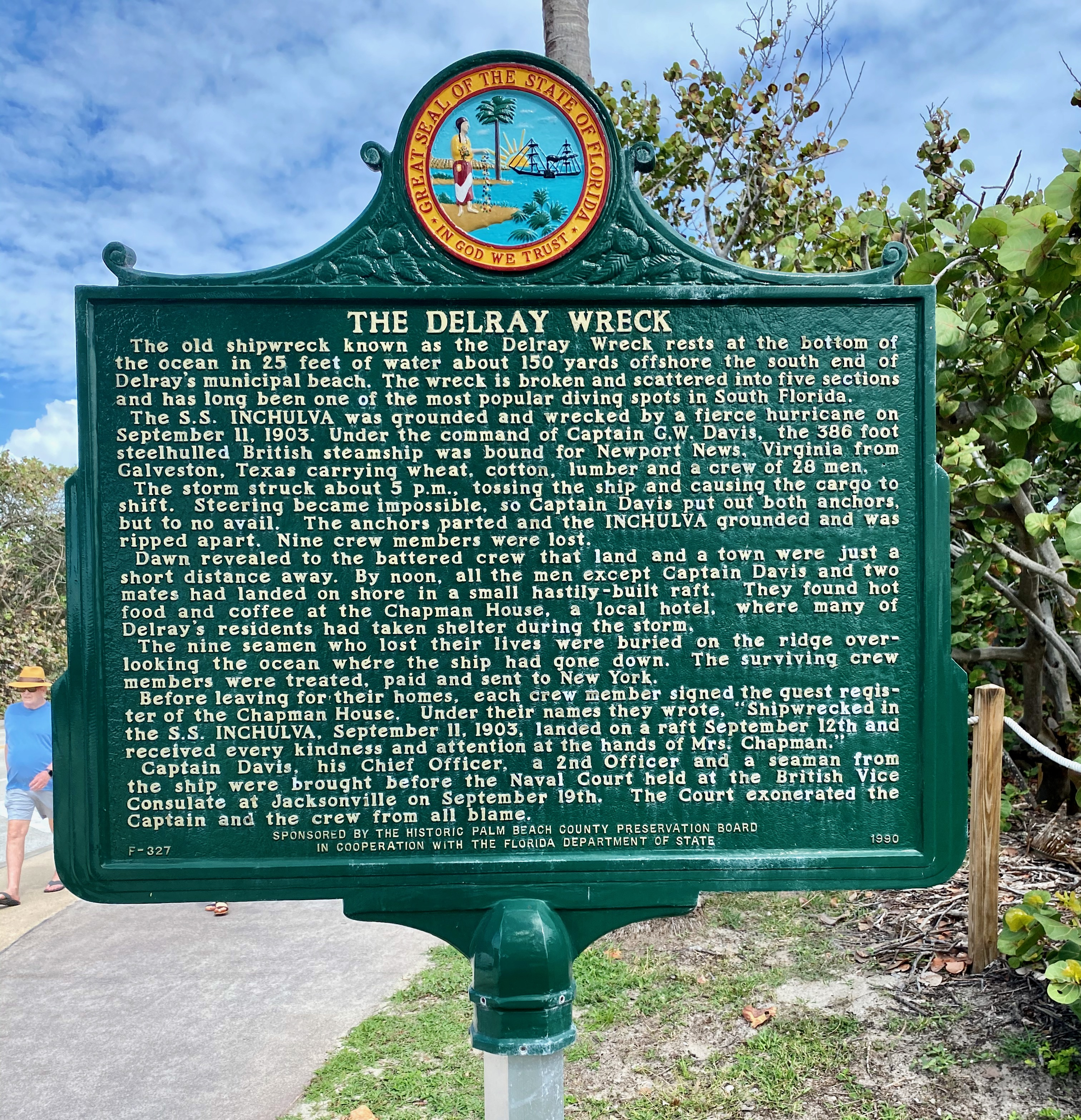
- Type: Shipwreck
- Location: Delray Beach, Florida
- Coordinates: 26°27′13″N 80°03′22″W

Delray Wreck is a site offshore in the Atlantic Ocean off the coast of Delray Beach. It is the site of the sinking of the steamship SS Inchulva during a hurricane in 1903. Nine men died in the accident. The wreck is located about 150 yards (140 m) offshore. It is now a popular dive site. A historical marker now stands on the city's multi-use path commemorating the wreck.

== Controversy ==
The captain of the ship, Captain Davis, as well as his chief officer, a second officer, and a seaman from the ship, were tried before a naval court in Jacksonville, Florida, on September 19 for causing the accident. The Court exonerated the captain and the crew from all blame.

In 1981 the city of Delray Beach, Florida paid $25,000 to settle a lawsuit stemming from a 1981 diving accident at the wreck.
