= 1932 Florida–Alabama hurricane =

Category 1 Atlantic hurricane in 1932

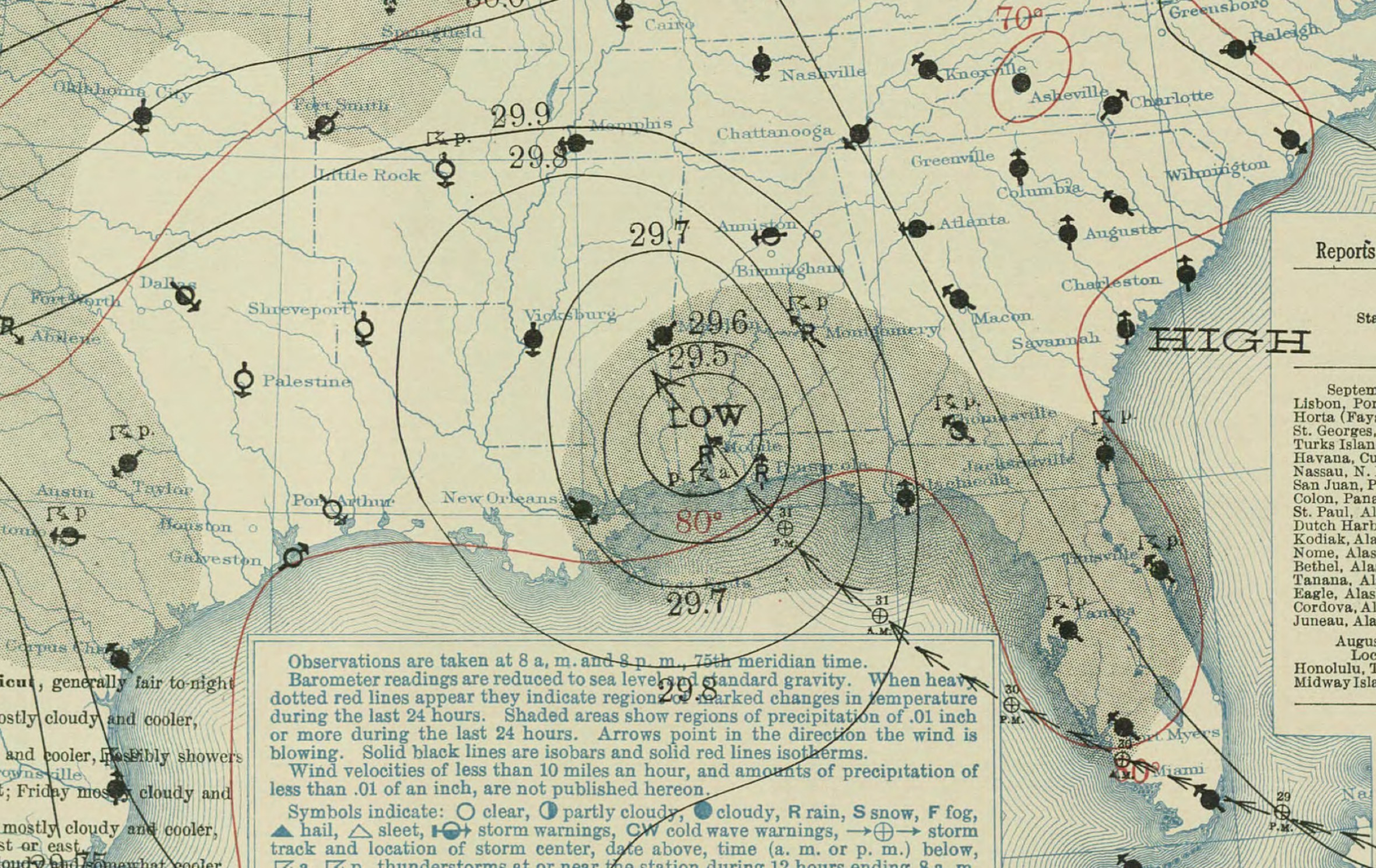
- Surface weather analysis of the hurricane shortly after landfall in Alabama on September 1

Meteorological history
- Formed: August 26, 1932
- Extratropical: September 2
- Dissipated: September 4, 1932

Category 1 hurricane
- 1-minute sustained (SSHWS/NWS)
- Highest winds: 85 mph (140 km/h)
- Lowest pressure: 979 mbar (hPa); 28.91 inHg

Overall effects
- Fatalities: 1 indirect
- Damage: $229,000 (1932 USD)
- Areas affected: Turks and Caicos Islands, The Bahamas, Southeastern United States, Midwest United States, Ontario, Quebec
- IBTrACS
- Part of the 1932 Atlantic hurricane season

The 1932 Florida–Alabama hurricane was a tropical cyclone that made two separate landfalls on the United States, causing devastation in affected areas. The third named storm and hurricane of the 1932 Atlantic hurricane season, it developed from a tropical disturbance north of Hispaniola on August 26. Slowly moving towards the west-northwest, the system intensified to tropical storm strength before making landfall on South Florida early on August 30. After crossing the Florida peninsula and entering the Gulf of Mexico, the system reached peak intensity as a Category 1 hurricane, before subsequently making its final landfall near the Mississippi–Alabama border on September 1. Over land, the hurricane weakened, and after becoming an extratropical cyclone on September 2, merged with another extratropical system over Quebec on September 4.

At the storm's initial landfall in southern Florida, heavy rains and strong winds caused extensive damage to crops, particularly to avocado and citrus. As the strengthening hurricane moved to the northwest through the Gulf of Mexico, it generated strong surf that caused severe damage to coastal areas across western Florida. At its second landfall, hurricane force winds were produced across a wide swath of the coast. Agricultural lands in coastal regions of Mississippi and Alabama were damaged by strong winds and heavy rain. The hurricane caused one indirect death and $228,500 in total damages across its path. (Note: All damage totals are in 1932 United States dollars unless otherwise noted.)

== Meteorological history ==
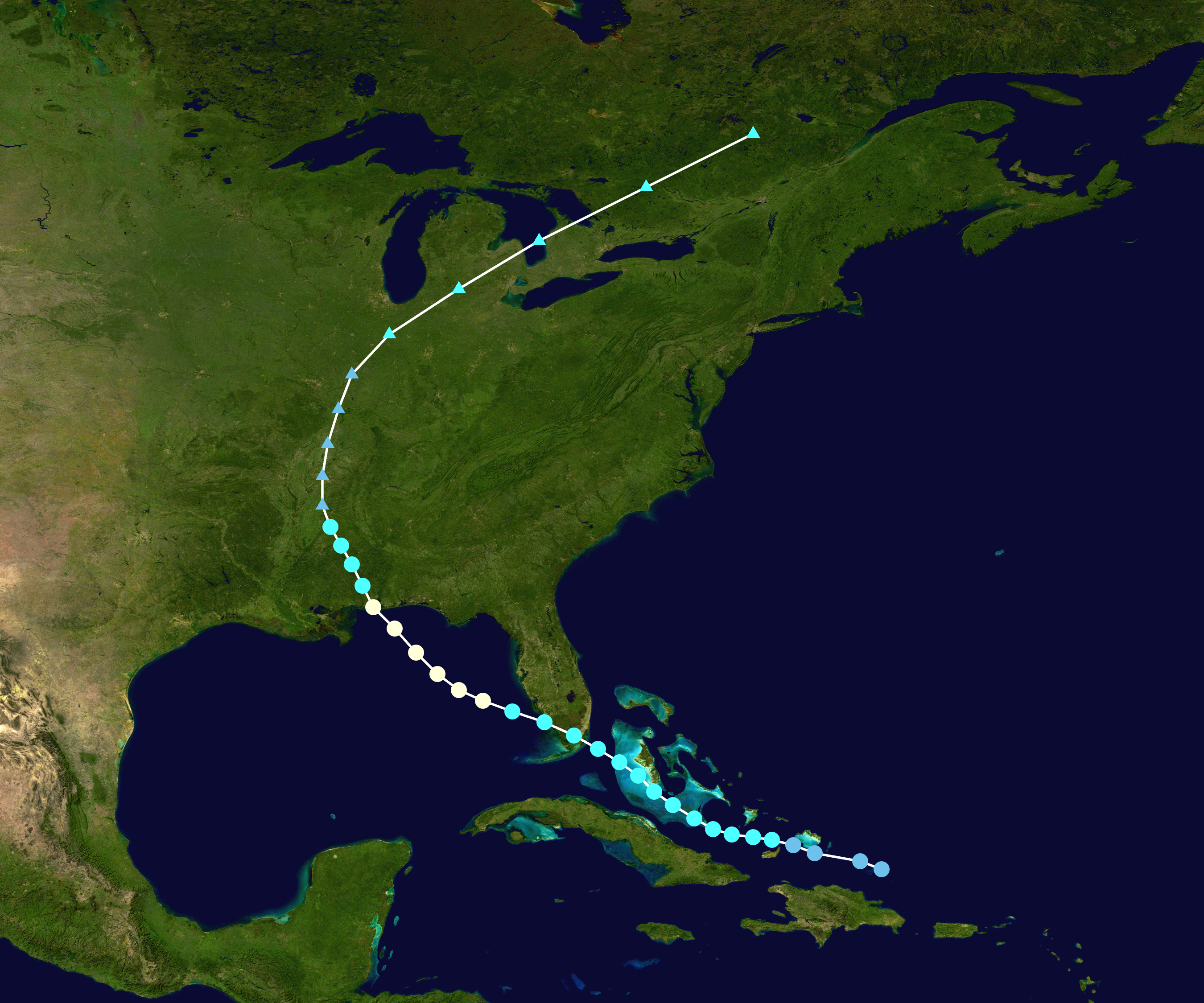
Map plotting the storm's track and intensity, according to the Saffir–Simpson scale Map key Saffir–Simpson scale Tropical depression (≤38 mph, ≤62 km/h) Tropical storm (39–73 mph, 63–118 km/h) Category 1 (74–95 mph, 119–153 km/h) Category 2 (96–110 mph, 154–177 km/h) Category 3 (111–129 mph, 178–208 km/h) Category 4 (130–156 mph, 209–251 km/h) Category 5 (≥157 mph, ≥252 km/h) Unknown Storm type Tropical cyclone Subtropical cyclone Extratropical cyclone, remnant low, tropical disturbance, or monsoon depression

A tropical disturbance was first noted southeast of Puerto Rico on August 24. Moving to the northwest at 10 mph (15 km/h), the area of disturbed weather eventually crossed the island. The Atlantic HURDAT database first lists the system as a tropical depression at 1800 UTC on August 26 while located north of Haiti, with maximum sustained winds of 35 mph (55 km/h). Steadily intensifying, the depression intensified to tropical storm strength at 1800 UTC on August 27. The strengthening tropical storm passed to the south of Andros Island during the evening of August 29, before making its first landfall 35 mi (55 km) south of Miami, Florida on Key Largo at 0400 UTC the next day as a strong, compact tropical storm with winds of 65 mph (100 km/h). A weather station located at the Fowey Rocks Light recorded a peak wind gust of 89 mph (143 km/h). In the Atlantic hurricane reanalysis project, it was evidenced that the storm may have been a hurricane upon landfall on Florida. After slightly weakening over land, the tropical storm entered the Gulf of Mexico in the early morning hours of August 30, while located 30 mi (48 km) south of Fort Myers.

After entering the gulf, the tropical storm proceeded to organize, strengthening into hurricane intensity early on August 31. As it curved more towards the north, the hurricane eventually made landfall near the Mississippi–Alabama border, west of Fort Morgan, Alabama, with maximum sustained winds of 85 mph (137 km/h), a Category 1 hurricane on the Saffir–Simpson hurricane scale. A ship located offshore of Mobile, Alabama recorded a minimum barometric pressure of 979 mbar (28.9 inHg). After making landfall, the hurricane gradually weakened over land as it curved towards the northeast, weakening to tropical storm strength at 1200 UTC on September 1. The weakening system transitioned into an extratropical cyclone over northern Mississippi the following day, after subsequently developing frontal boundaries. The extratropical system strengthened slightly as it accelerated towards the northeast, but was later absorbed by a larger extratropical system over Quebec by 1800 UTC on September 4.

== Preparations, impact, and aftermath ==
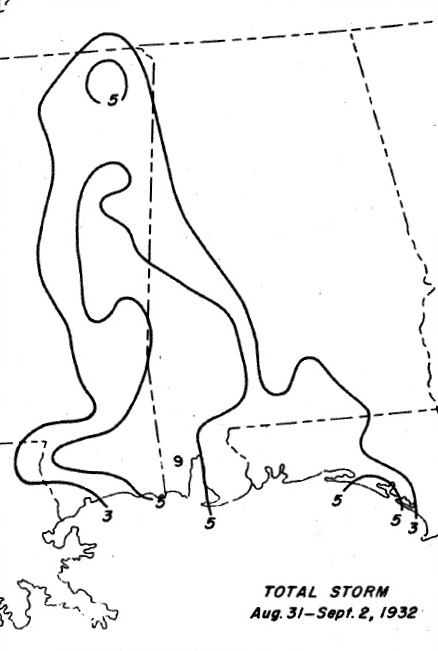
Rainfall totals from the hurricane's second landfall

=== Florida ===
Prior to the storm's first landfall in southern Florida, the Weather Bureau issued hurricane warnings beginning on August 29 for areas of Florida's east coast from Palm Beach south to Key West, while storm warnings were issued from Key West to Boca Grande on the peninsula's western coast. Electrical power was purposely stopped in Miami as a precautionary measure prior to the storm's landfall. Two Red Cross officials were sent to Miami to monitor the area during the storm's passage. Other relief agencies were also preparing supplies in the event of an emergency. In Pahokee and Belle Glade, an estimated 2,000 people evacuated to Okeechobee, fearing a repeat of the 1928 Okeechobee hurricane.

Most of the damage associated with the tropical storm's first landfall in Florida was confined south of 27 °N. Recently planted seed beds were washed away by heavy rains associated with the storm. A Miami weather station reported 10.24 in (260 mm) of rain in a 24-hour period ending on August 30, setting a record for that station. A portion of the MacArthur Causeway, which connects Miami to Miami Beach, was washed out due to the winds, but did not affect traffic. Rainfall in St. Petersburg measured 3.79 in (96 mm), while Fort Myers measured 6.52 in (166 mm) of rain. The heavy rains also flooded streets in parts of Sarasota, Florida, and strong winds caused minor power outages. Communication lines between Fort Myers and Everglades, Florida also went down during the storm. Strong winds were responsible for destroying 2–25% of avocado and citrus trees along the path of the tropical storm. Grapefruit crops also suffered loses due to strong winds. Firefighters in Hollywood were forced to stop extinguishing a fire after winds damaged their equipment. The fire would eventually cause $20,000 in damages. Offshore, a 60 ft (18 m) long boat that was towed out of Biscayne Bay for dredging operations partially sank due to the rough seas.

Before the hurricane's second landfall, another hurricane warning was issued for portions of the state, for areas of the coast from Panama City westward. Boats from Naval Air Station Pensacola were taken to nearby bayous ahead of the storm. Other ships were also sheltered as a precautionary measure. As the hurricane moved towards the Gulf Coast region, the hurricane caused strong storm surge and generated rough seas, disrupting coastal and marine activities. In Madeira Beach, the passing hurricane caused above-average tides that moved 15–20 ft (4.6–6.1 m) further inland than normal. Offshore, two fishing boats attempting to cross Tampa Bay had to be rescued after they became stranded in the rough seas generated by the tropical storm. In Dog Island, nine people were rescued from the Cuban schooner Asturias after it washed up on the island shore. Off of Apalachicola, nine fishing boats sunk due to the waves. The tide height offshore Apalachicola at the time was 4.5 ft (1.4 m) above average, causing damage to small craft moored at the wharves. The strong surf alone was responsible for about $1,000 in damages. Strong storm surge off of Pensacola caused water levels that were the highest in the area in several years. Sections of a pier at Pensacola Beach were washed away by the strong waves. Five fishermen were initially reported drowned after their fishing boat struck a reef and was swamped by the storm surge in Pensacola Bay. However, the men were later reported safe at a coast guard life saving station. The misreport was likely due a lack of communication with the station. Another three men went missing after they departed in a small boat in aid of another boat offshore Pensacola.

Inland effects of the hurricane's second landfall in Florida were mostly confined to areas of the Florida Panhandle west of Apalachicola. Cotton crops in Okaloosa and Escambia counties were damaged due to the wind and rain effects of the hurricane. Numerous pears were also blown off of trees by the strong winds. The highest rainfall totals in the panhandle region were concentrated around the Panama City area, where rain totals were estimated to be in excess of 5 in (130 mm). Property damage in Pensacola was relatively minor, and was limited to awnings, windows, and signboards. In Pensacola Beach, communications were disrupted due to the storm. A 12–year old boy in Pensacola died after touching an active electric wire that had fallen during the storm. Total damages in the Pensacola area were estimated to amount to around $100,000.

=== Mississippi and Alabama ===
Hurricane warnings were posted by the Weather Bureau for the entire Alabama coast, and portions of the Mississippi coast from Biloxi eastward prior to the storm. Merchants in potentially affected areas prepared their stores ahead of the hurricane. The potential storm surge threat forced boats in Biloxi to be taken to shelter in a nearby landlocked harbor.

Hurricane force winds were felt in both states when the storm made landfall. Pear and pecan trees were severely damaged by the strong winds caused by the hurricane, while orange trees were defoliated along coastal regions. Winds also extensively damaged cotton and corn crops. Heavy rains also helped to damage crops. Rainfall peaked at 9.1 in (230 mm) in Mobile, Alabama. Other reports of at least 3 in (76 mm) of rain were common along the Mississippi–Alabama border. Sections of the Mobile waterfront were submerged by the hurricane's storm surge. The high surf also flooded Bayou LaBatre and Bayou Coden in Mobile. Total property damage in the city amounted to $105,000 in damages. In Gulfport, Mississippi, damage was confined primarily to trees, communication lines, and small craft. Further inland, the hurricane spawned an F2 tornado 3 mi (4.8 km) southwest of Troy, Alabama on September 1. The tornado destroyed two homes and several barns and injured four people in its 6 mi (9.7 km) path, causing $2,500 in damages.

== See also ==
- Hurricane Five (1936)
- Hurricane Erin (1995)
- Hurricane Four (1901)
