= 1948 Bermuda–Newfoundland hurricane =

Category 4 Atlantic hurricane in 1948

Hurricane Six (Dog)
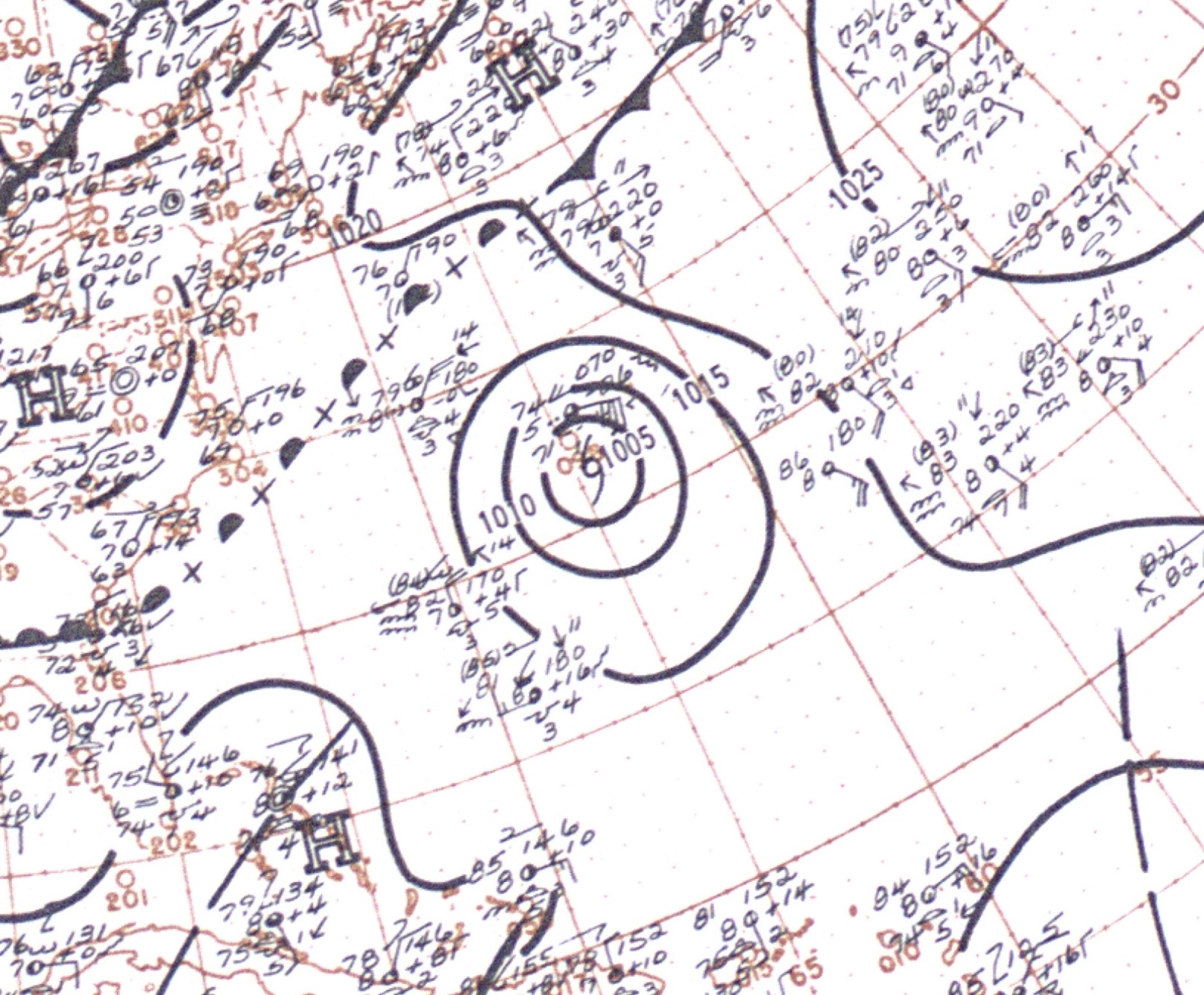
- Surface Weather map of the hurricane at peak intensity just south of Bermuda on September 13

Meteorological history
- Formed: September 4, 1948
- Extratropical: September 15, 1948
- Dissipated: September 16, 1948

Category 4 major hurricane
- 1-minute sustained (SSHWS/NWS)
- Highest winds: 130 mph (215 km/h)
- Lowest pressure: ≥940 mbar (hPa); ≥27.76 inHg

Overall effects
- Fatalities: 8 total
- Damage: $400,000 (1948 USD)
- Areas affected: Bermuda, Newfoundland
- IBTrACS
- Part of the 1948 Atlantic hurricane season

The 1948 Bermuda–Newfoundland hurricane (Air Weather Service designation: Dog) was an intense and long-lived Cape Verde tropical cyclone that caused significant damage in Bermuda and areas of Newfoundland in September 1948. The storm was the eighth named storm and third hurricane of the annual hurricane season. Originating as a tropical wave off the coast of Africa on September 4, the cyclone tracked a general westward path for much of its initial stages as it gradually intensified, reaching tropical storm intensity shortly after development and then hurricane intensity a day later. After reaching a longitude roughly equal to that of the Lesser Antilles, the hurricane began to curve northward on a parabolic track, bringing it near Bermuda at peak intensity as a Category 4 hurricane on September 13. Afterwards, the hurricane began to accelerate northeastwards and weaken. The waning tropical cyclone grazed Cape Race before transitioning into an extratropical cyclone on September 15; these remnants persisted for an additional day.

Despite never making landfall, the tropical cyclone disrupted numerous shipping lanes and inflicted damage on Bermuda and Newfoundland. In the former, the hurricane brought winds in excess of 100 mph (160 km/h), downing power lines and felled trees. Property damage also resulted from the strong winds. Overall damage on the island totaled $400,000. (Note: All damage totals are in 1948 United States dollars.) After passing west of Bermuda, the tropical cyclone tracked across numerous shipping lanes. Two ships, the Leicester and Gaspar, encountered the hurricane and became stricken in open waters. Though most people were rescued from both ships, six people perished on the former while one died on the latter. Beginning on September 15, the hurricane tracked east of Newfoundland, producing heavy rainfall on land. The precipitation flooded roads and caused streams to overflow, inundating additional areas. On the island, two people were killed. Overall, the hurricane caused eight fatalities.

== Meteorological history ==
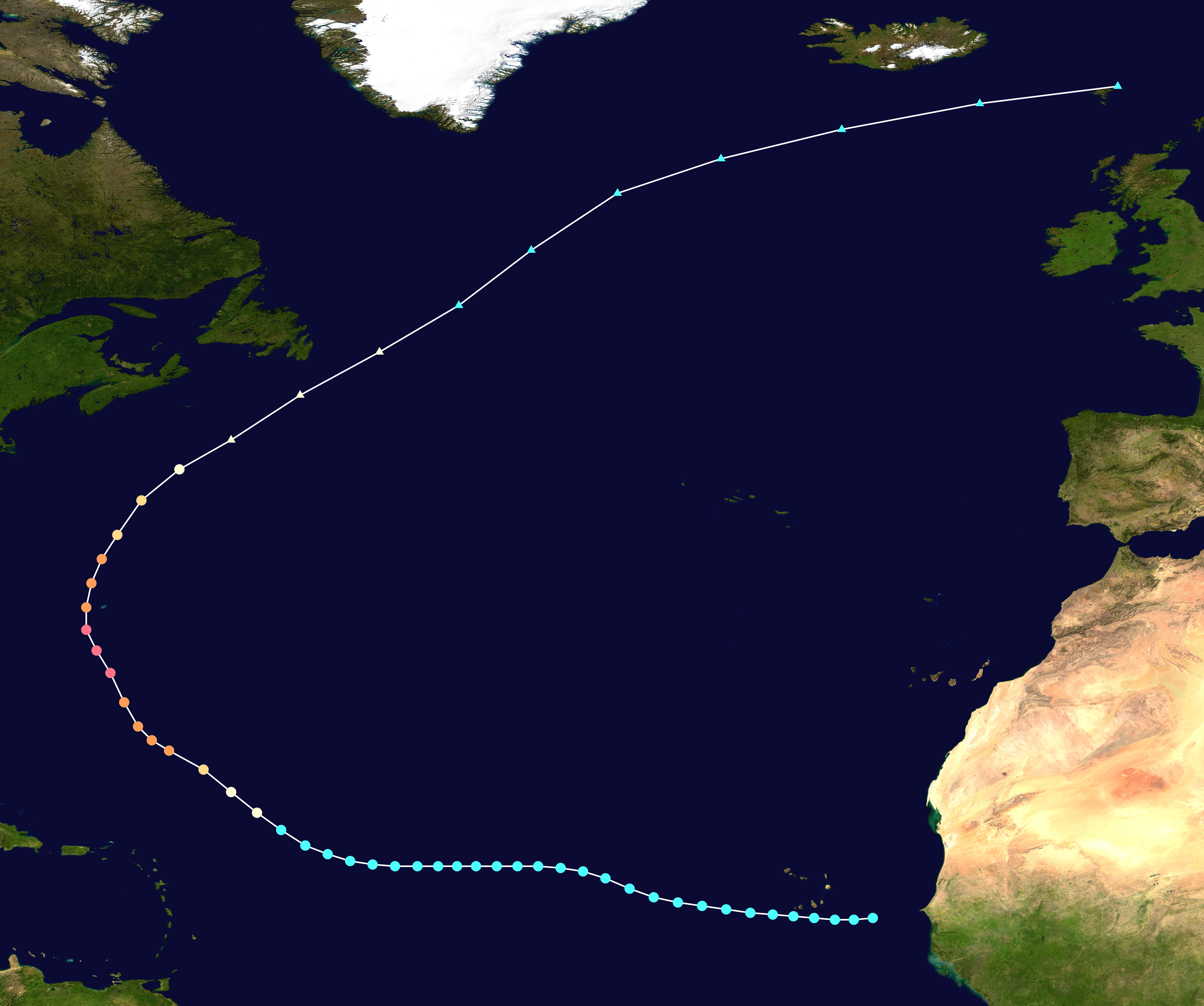
Map plotting the storm's track and intensity, according to the Saffir–Simpson scale Map key Saffir–Simpson scale Tropical depression (≤38 mph, ≤62 km/h) Tropical storm (39–73 mph, 63–118 km/h) Category 1 (74–95 mph, 119–153 km/h) Category 2 (96–110 mph, 154–177 km/h) Category 3 (111–129 mph, 178–208 km/h) Category 4 (130–156 mph, 209–251 km/h) Category 5 (≥157 mph, ≥252 km/h) Unknown Storm type Tropical cyclone Subtropical cyclone Extratropical cyclone, remnant low, tropical disturbance, or monsoon depression

On September 3, the tropical wave from which the resulting hurricane would develop from was detected just off the coast of western Africa near Dakar. This marked the second consecutive year in which a tropical cyclone could be traced back as far east as Africa. In HURDAT – the official database for tropical cyclones in the North Atlantic dating back to 1851 Atlantic hurricane season – the area of disturbed weather is estimated to have organized into a tropical storm by 0600 UTC the following day. Over the course of the succeeding week, the tropical cyclone moved in a general westward direction as it gradually intensified, reaching hurricane intensity by 0000 UTC on September 5 and then attaining the equivalent of a modern-day Category 2 hurricane on the Saffir–Simpson hurricane scale at 0600 UTC on September 8. Up until this time, its existence and trek across the central Atlantic was only inferred, however, aircraft reconnaissance detected and as such confirmed the existence of the tropical cyclone the following day while the hurricane was situated approximately 900 mi (1,400 km) east of Antigua. Operationally, however, the reconnaissance flight significantly underestimated the winds of the tropical cyclone, with estimates of tropical storm-force winds at the storm's center.

Thereafter, the hurricane began curving northward as it continued to intensify, reaching the equivalent of a modern-day Category 3 hurricane – a major hurricane (Note: A major hurricane is a storm that ranks as Category 3 or higher on the Saffir–Simpson hurricane wind scale.) – by September 11. Two days later, the storm strengthened further into a Category 4 hurricane. As no reasonably quantifiable strengthening occurred afterwards, this also marked the storm's official peak intensity as maximum sustained winds were analyzed at 135 mph (215 km/h). However, aircraft reconnaissance estimated wind speeds of at least 140 mph (225 km/h) at roughly the same time frame. The storm's northward recurvature caused it to track just west of Bermuda late on September 13. Afterwards, a weakening trend began as the hurricane tracked northeastward into more northerly latitudes. By September 15, the storm had been downgraded to minimal hurricane intensity. After passing south of Cape Race later that day, the hurricane transitioned into an extratropical cyclone, and continued to track northward until it was last noted by 1800 UTC the next day near Greenland. During the storm's twelve-day trek, the hurricane tracked approximately 3,500 mi (5,600 km), roughly equidistant to the distance between New York City and London.

== Preparations and impact ==
=== Central Atlantic and Bermuda ===
As the hurricane traversed the Central Atlantic, the United States Weather Bureau indicated that the storm would not be a threat to continental land masses due to its isolated position. (Note: Until the inception of the present-day National Hurricane Center in 1966, the United States Weather Bureau and later Miami Hurricane Warning Office handled tropical cyclone operations in the northern Atlantic basin.) However, ships in the storm's vicinity and to the northwest of the hurricane were advised caution. Other shipping lanes in the forecast path of the hurricane were also warned. After recurving in the direction of Bermuda, the British overseas colony was advised to begin prompt precautionary measures against storm surge and strong winds, which were expected from the hurricane. Aircraft from the United States Air Force and Navy stationed in Bermuda were sent to airfields in the United States to avoid the hurricane, while a Navy task force of twelve ships including the escort carrier USS Mindoro (CVE-120) were dispatched from the island. The U.S. naval operating base moved boats from exposed areas into safer parts of the base. Similar precautionary measures were undertaken by the British naval operating base.

On Bermuda, the hurricane brought sustained winds estimated between 93–103 mph (150–166 km/h), with higher gusts. A minimum pressure of 958 mbar (hPa; 28.30 inHg) was recorded, though a lower pressure may have occurred on the island as the barometer had been falling at the time. The strong winds downed power lines and felled trees, littering insular streets with debris. As a result, power outages occurred and loss of telecommunications was reported. Radio stations based on the island went silent due to the power loss. An emergency backup power generator at King Edward Memorial Hospital was used to restore electrical power to the facility. However, oil lamps were still used in place of any form of electrical lighting. Several slate roofs were torn from their buildings from the strong winds. Heavy rainfall associated with the hurricane flooded long stretches of roadway. Some roads were blocked and rendered impassable by the rainfall. At the local harbor, six vessels were inundated by the strong offshore wave action. Overall, property damage on the island was estimated at $400,000.

=== Mid-Atlantic and Newfoundland ===
After sweeping past Bermuda, the Weather Bureau continued to advise caution to shipping lanes in the storm's proximity. Two coastal railway steamers destined for a Newfoundland port were delayed as a result of the approaching storm. All flights headed for Torbay Airport were suspended until the storm's passage. Before affecting Newfoundland, however, the hurricane impacted numerous shipping lanes in the open Atlantic. The freighter Leicester, which had departed from London and was headed for New York City, was caught in the hurricane late on September 14 while situated roughly 400 mi (640 km) southwest of Cape Race, Newfoundland. As weather conditions deteriorated, the ship began to list, and as such the crew abandoned the ship late the following day. The American steamship Cecil N. Bean and the Argentinian steamship Tropero both assisted in rescue operations and rescued 39 crew members. However, six other remained unaccounted for and were presumed dead. The Portuguese fishing schooner Gaspar was also caught in the storm roughly 300 mi (480 km) off of Newfoundland, and although initial reports presumed that it had already sunk, the United States Coast Guard indicated that the ship was in no need of assistance. However, the ship was still abandoned and 41 crewmen were rescued, though one person was lost.

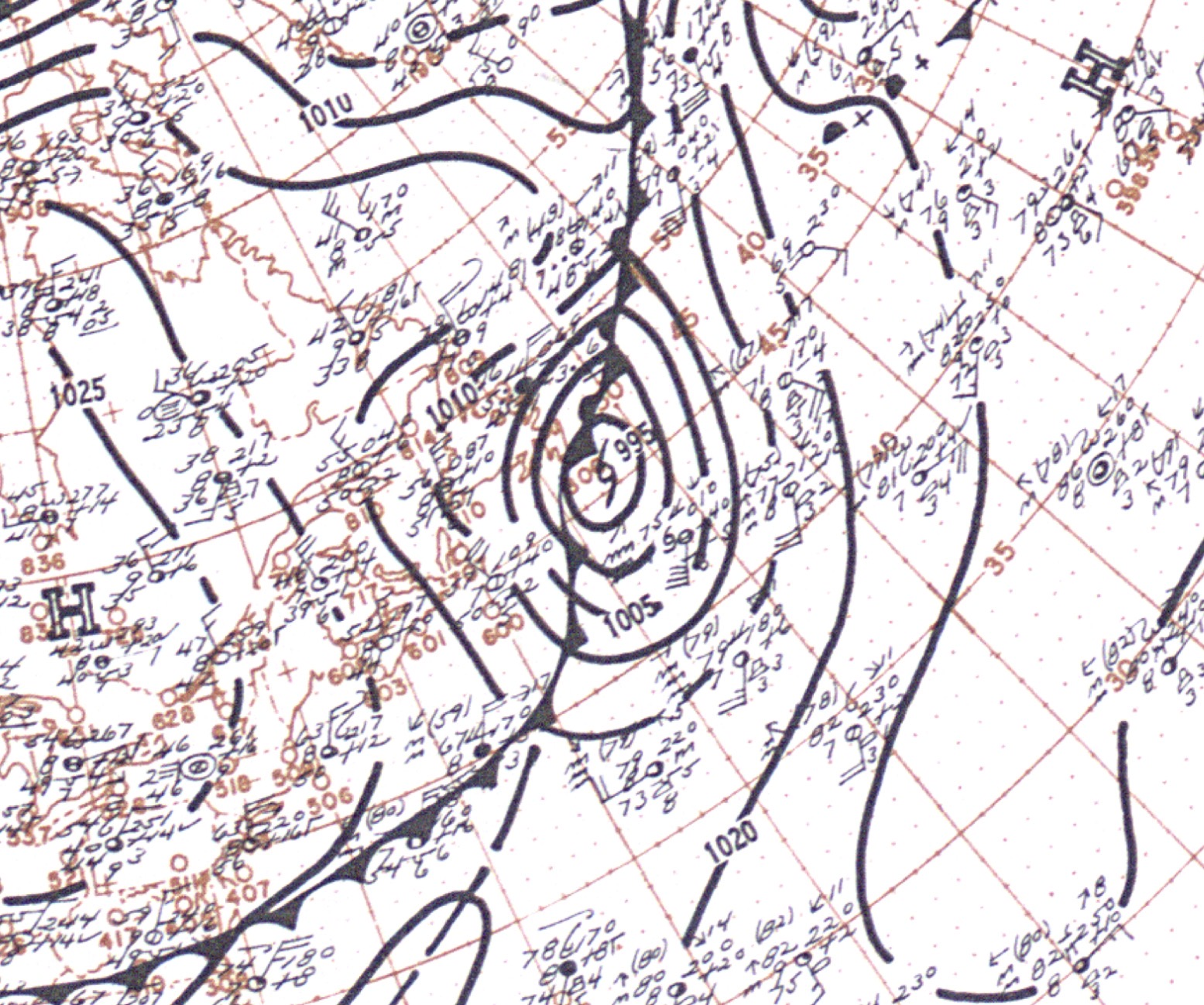
Surface weather map of the hurricane at its closest approach towards Newfoundland on September 15

Much of the effects from the hurricane on Newfoundland occurred on September 15 and continued until September 18. With winds equivalent to that of a Category 1 hurricane, the cyclone brushed east of the island, bringing extensive flooding. Offshore, a ship estimated winds in excess of 80 mph (130 km/h) off of Grand Bank. Precipitation peaked at a record 4.5 in (110 mm) at Fort Pepperrell. In St. John's, train traffic was effectively halted because of the hurricane. Silt kicked up by the strong winds covered railroad tracks in the southern portions of the city, while heavy rainfall flooded several city streets. Similar problems occurred in Avondale. The nearby Rennie River overflowed its banks, inundating adjacent land. The urban flooding damaged adjacent infrastructure. A three-year-old girl died on September 16 after a landslide triggered by the rain filled the first floor of her home. This was the only death associated with the hurricane on the island. In Holyrood, the local highway was washed out in areas. A small trestle with two concrete abutments were swept off into the adjacent bay. Another road leading to Cape Saint Francis suffered wash outs as deep as 4 ft (1.2 m). Small bridges were also damaged, and some were washed away. As with the Rennie River, the Waterford River also overflowed its banks due to excessive recharge, and as such inundated 13 homes. Another river near Kilbride overflowed, flooding adjacent plots of land and tearing apart pavement. In this manner, several roads were rendered impassable and were cut off to traffic.

== See also ==
- List of Bermuda hurricanes
- Hurricane Carrie – Record-breaking and long-lasting tropical cyclone that caused the deadly sinking of the Pamir after threatening Bermuda
- Hurricane Igor – Affected Bermuda for a prolonged period of time before severely impacting Newfoundland
- Hurricane Ophelia (2011) – Threatened Bermuda before making landfall in eastern Newfoundland
