= September 1948 Florida hurricane =

Category 4 Atlantic hurricane in 1948

Hurricane Eight (Easy)
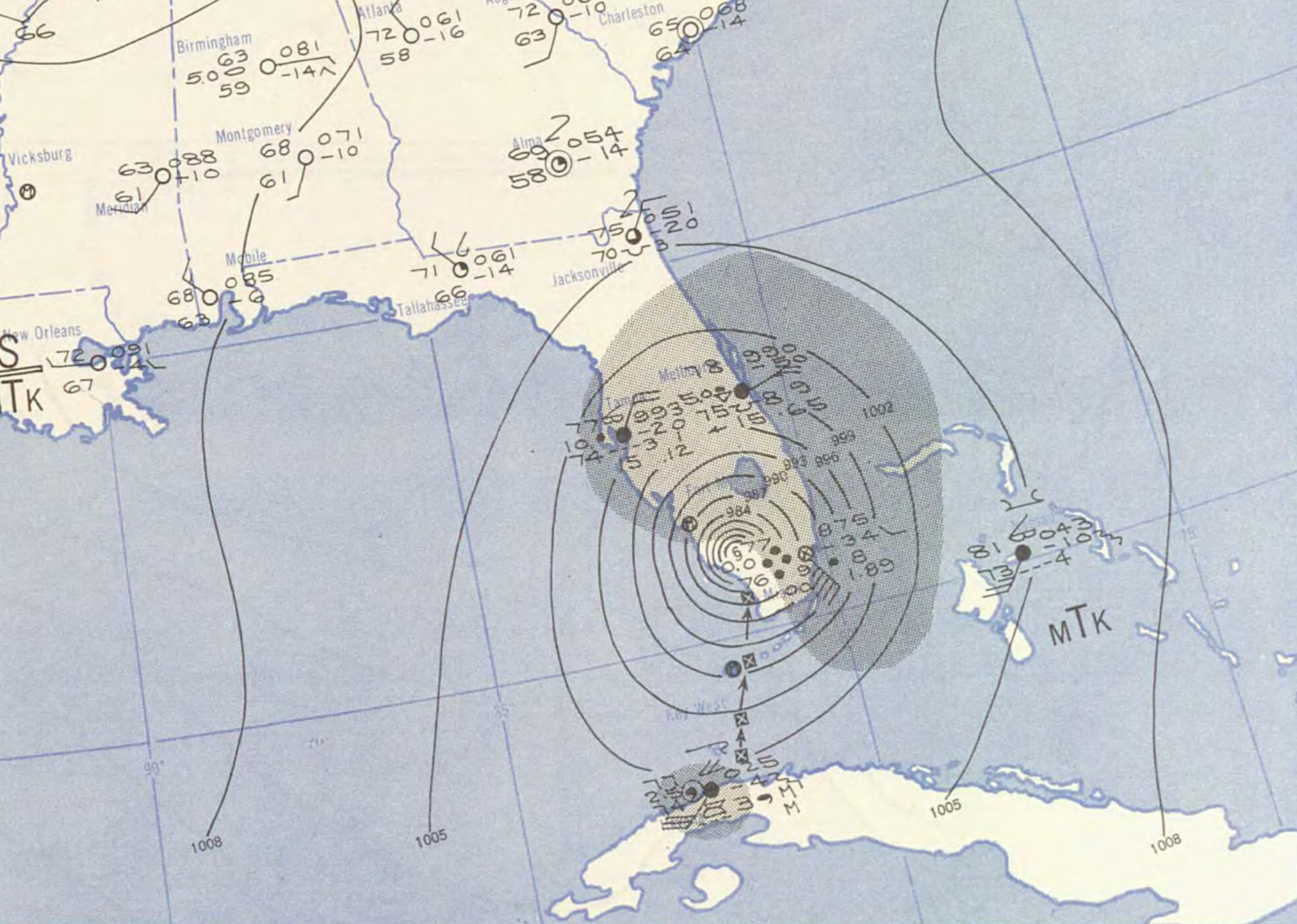
- Surface weather analysis of the hurricane shortly after landfall at peak intensity in Southwest Florida on September 22

Meteorological history
- Formed: September 18, 1948
- Extratropical: September 24, 1948
- Dissipated: September 26, 1948

Category 4 major hurricane
- 1-minute sustained (SSHWS/NWS)
- Highest winds: 130 mph (215 km/h)
- Lowest pressure: ≤940 mbar (hPa); ≤27.76 inHg

Overall effects
- Fatalities: 13 direct
- Damage: $14 million (1948 USD)
- Areas affected: Cayman Islands, Cuba, and Florida
- IBTrACS
- Part of the 1948 Atlantic hurricane season

The September 1948 Florida hurricane (Air Weather Service designation: Easy) was the most intense tropical cyclone to make landfall in the state since the 1935 Labor Day hurricane. The fourth hurricane and third major hurricane of the season, (Note: A major hurricane is a storm that ranks as Category 3 or higher on the Saffir-Simpson hurricane wind scale.) this storm developed from a tropical wave over the Caribbean Sea on September 18. Early the next day, the system strengthened into a hurricane while moving westward passing close to Grand Cayman, Cayman Islands. Thereafter, it curved northwestward and continued to deepen. By September 20, the system turned northward and later that day made landfall in Zapata Peninsula, Cuba as a Category 3 hurricane on the modern day Saffir–Simpson hurricane wind scale. Another landfall occurred in Cuba early the next day to the south of Güines. Severe destruction was reported on the island, with winds up to 90 mph (140 km/h) observed in Havana. Over 700 buildings were destroyed. Ten deaths occurred and damage totaled at least $2 million (1948 USD), (Note: All damage figures are in 1948 USD, unless otherwise noted) while other sources estimate "several million dollars."

After emerging into the Straits of Florida on September 21, the storm resumed intensification, before striking near Boca Chica Key, Florida with winds of 120 mph (195 km/h). By early on September 22, the system peaked as a Category 4 hurricane with maximum sustained winds of 130 mph (215 km/h). Shortly thereafter, another landfall occurred near Chokoloskee, Florida at the same intensity. Severe damage was reported in the state due to strong winds. The storm was considered the worst in Key West since the 1919 Florida Keys hurricane. Throughout the state, 1,200 homes were severely damaged or destroyed, while 40 businesses were demolished and 237 suffered impact. Throughout Florida, there were three fatalities and approximately $12 million (1948 USD) in damage, over half of which was inflicted on crops. The storm rapidly weakened while crossing the state and emerged into the Atlantic Ocean as only a Category 1 hurricane later on September 22. Slight fluctuations in intensity occurred before the hurricane became extratropical early on September 24, while located northwest of Bermuda.

== Meteorological history ==
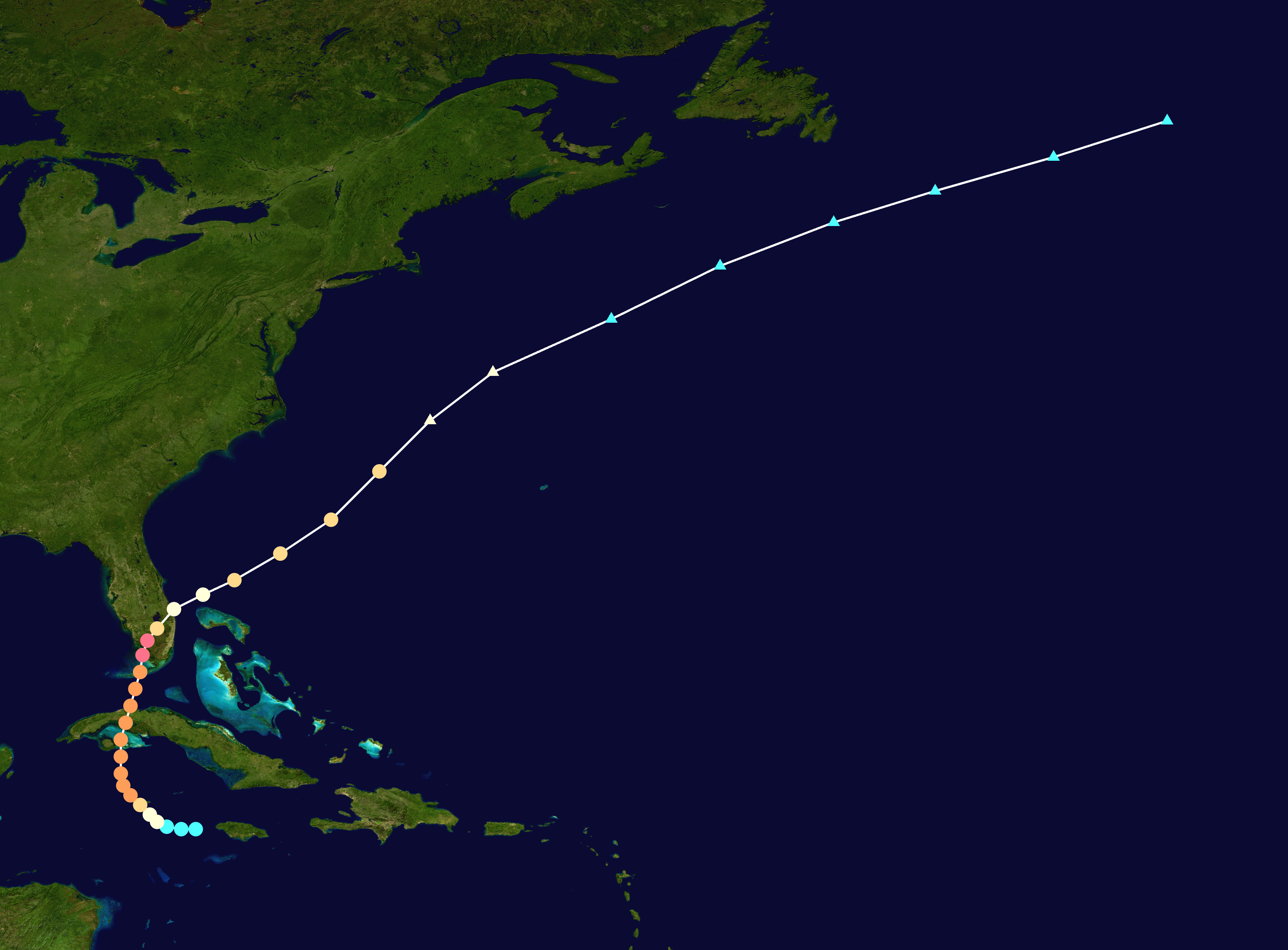
Map plotting the storm's track and intensity, according to the Saffir–Simpson scale Map key Saffir–Simpson scale Tropical depression (≤38 mph, ≤62 km/h) Tropical storm (39–73 mph, 63–118 km/h) Category 1 (74–95 mph, 119–153 km/h) Category 2 (96–110 mph, 154–177 km/h) Category 3 (111–129 mph, 178–208 km/h) Category 4 (130–156 mph, 209–251 km/h) Category 5 (≥157 mph, ≥252 km/h) Unknown Storm type Tropical cyclone Subtropical cyclone Extratropical cyclone, remnant low, tropical disturbance, or monsoon depression

A tropical wave – an elongated trough of low pressure – was detected moving through the Leeward Islands on September 14. The system acquired a circulation while situated between Grand Cayman and Jamaica on September 18. Thus, a tropical storm developed at 06:00 UTC. With initial sustained winds of 45 mph (75 km/h), the storm quickly intensified while heading westward, and became a Category 1 hurricane on the modern-day Saffir–Simpson hurricane wind scale early on September 19 while passing near Grand Cayman, Cayman Islands. Later that day, the storm strengthened into a Category 2 hurricane and then a Category 3 hurricane only six hours after. The hurricane turned northward on September 20 and made landfall on the Zapata Peninsula of Cuba with winds of 125 mph (205 km/h) at 22:00 UTC. With the storm continuing to move northward, it made another landfall in Cuba at 01:00 UTC the following day near Güines, Mayabeque Province. Emerging into the Straits of Florida early on September 21, the hurricane weakened somewhat to a minimal Category 3 hurricane while moving across Cuba.

The hurricane restrengthened slightly on September 21, before making landfall near Boca Chica Key, Florida at 17:00 UTC, with sustained winds of 120 mph (195 km/h). Around that time, the storm's eye was only 10 mi (16 km) in diameter. However, it deepened further and became a Category 4 hurricane early on September 22. At 05:00 UTC, the system attained its peak intensity with a maximum sustained wind speed of 130 mph (215 km/h) and a minimum barometric pressure of 940 mbar (28 inHg). Simultaneously, it struck near Chokoloskee, Florida. Due to the storm's barometric pressure at the time, it was the most intense tropical cyclone landfall in Florida since the 1935 Labor Day hurricane. Several locations reported an "eye", leading some meteorologists at the time to suggest that the storm had multiple circulations, though others theorized that dry air pockets existed between the rainbands. The hurricane rapidly weakened while moving northeastward across the state and was only a Category 1 hurricane upon emerging into the Atlantic Ocean near Jensen Beach late on September 22. Slight re-intensification occurred the following day, with the storm becoming a moderate Category 2 hurricane by 12:00 UTC. Nonetheless, it began losing tropical characteristics and transitioning into an extratropical cyclone early on September 24, while located about 330 miles (530 km) northwest of Bermuda. The remnants accelerated to the east-northeastward and continued to weaken, before dissipating hundreds of miles east of Newfoundland on September 26.

== Preparations and impact ==
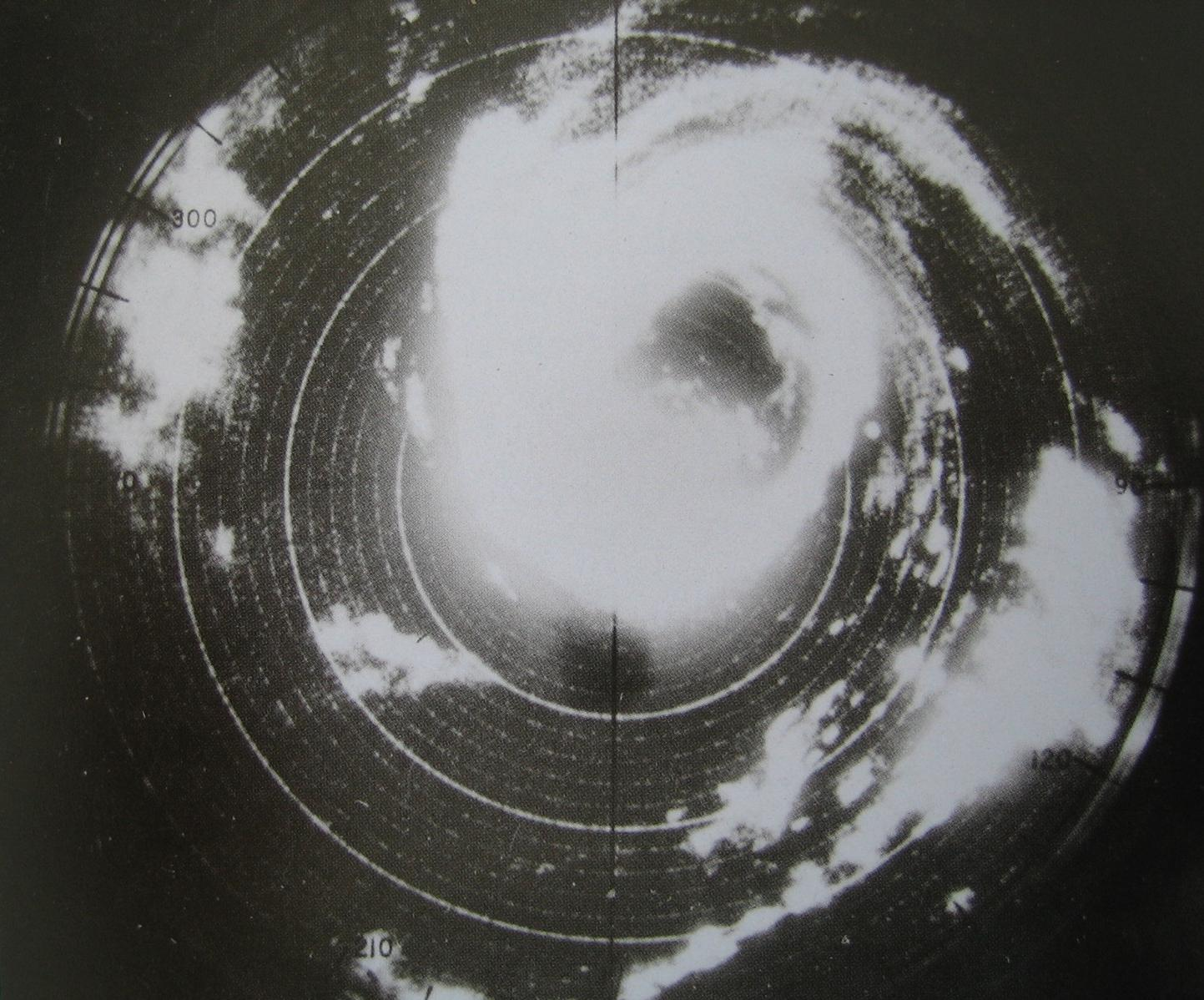
Radar image of the hurricane on September 21 as it moves into the Straits of Florida

Offshore Grand Cayman, the British steamer Lochmonar, with 72 people aboard, encountered the hurricane on September 19. The ship ran aground in seas that were "as rough as hell". They were safely rescued by a United States Coast Guard tugboat on September 20.

Strong winds were reported on Cuba, with sustained winds up to 90 mph (140 km/h) observed in Havana. Damage was particularly severe in that city and Matanzas. Almost 700 buildings were destroyed. Damage on the island totaled "several million dollars", with some sources reporting at least $2 million. There were ten deaths and at least 200 injuries in Cuba.

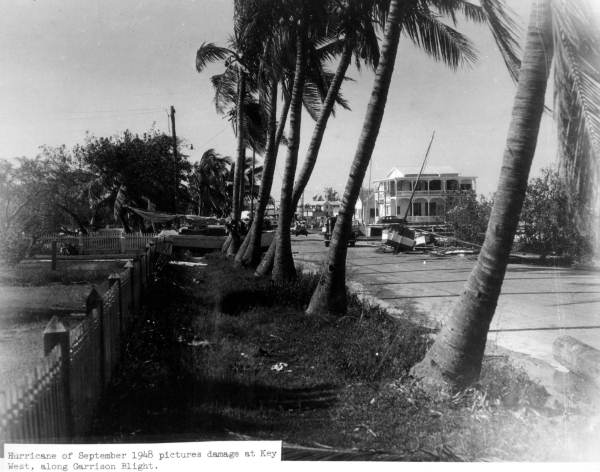
Damage along a street in Key West, Florida

In preparation for the storm, the American Red Cross opened 213 shelters, which were collectively occupied by 38,323 people. Officials prepared two trains at Fort Pierce to evacuate residents living along Lake Okeechobee. Many residents in the area sought higher ground, but most refused to evacuate via the trains. Strong winds lashed Florida, with a sustained wind speed of 122 mph (196 km/h) observed at the Naval Air Station Key West, before the anemometer blew away. There, 30 commercial and private aircraft were destroyed. Winds de-roofed some homes and businesses nearby. Tides reached about 6 ft (1.8 m) above mean low water. The hurricane was considered the worst in Key West since 1919. About 3–5 in (76–127 mm) of rain fell on the Florida Keys.

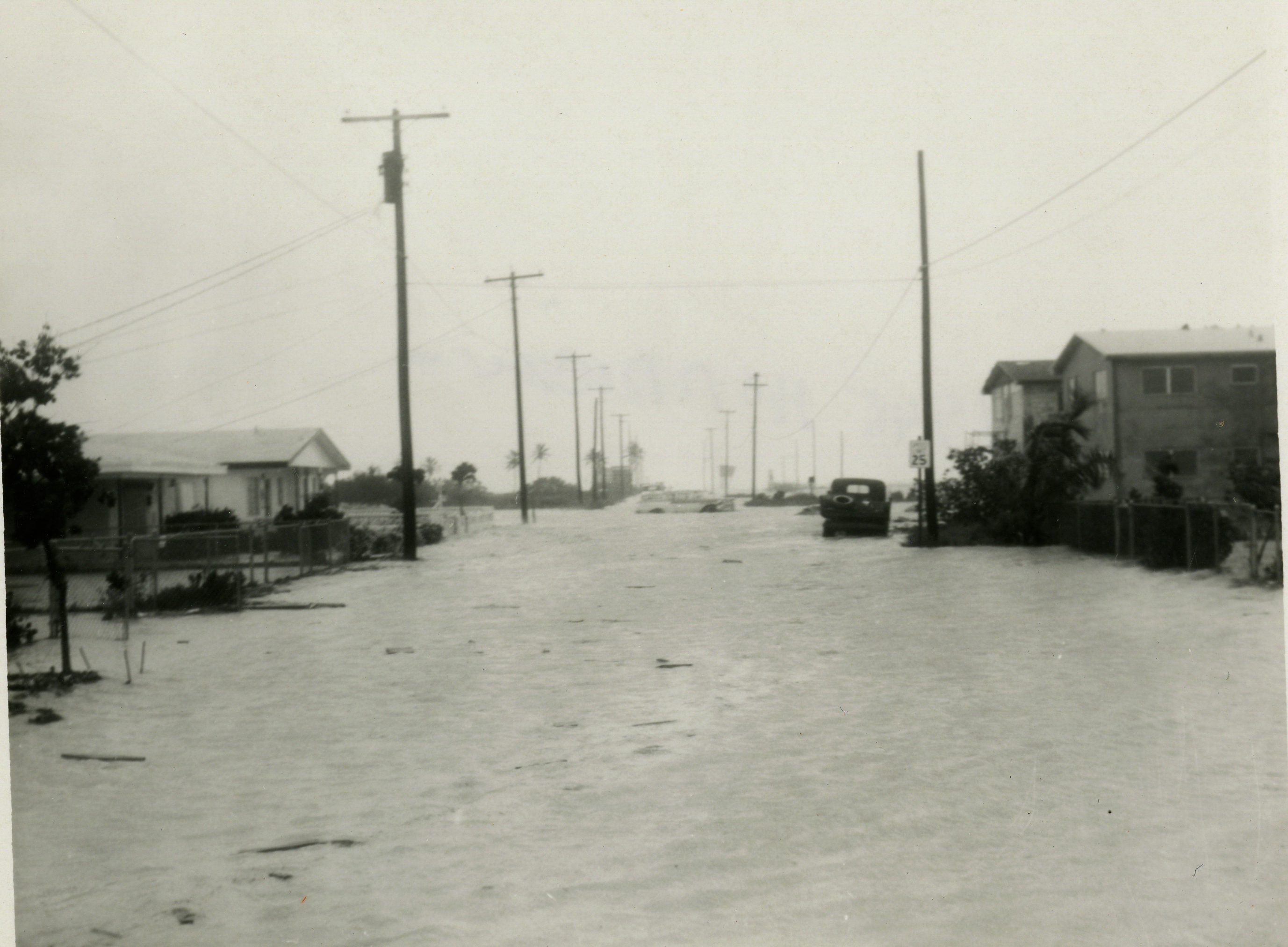
Flooding on Bertha Street in Key West from the hurricane

In Homestead, a tornado destroyed a farmhouse and overturned a 3,000 lb (1,400 kg) truck. Two deaths occurred in Miami; a woman was electrocuted by a broken wire, while a man was presumably blown off a 5-story building. Tides in the city reached 4.5 ft (1.4 m) above mean low water, causing inundation of the bayfront and smashing large breakers and small crafts against the shore and piers. In the neighborhood of Coconut Grove, docking facilities, piers, and houseboats were severely damaged. Strong winds downed palm trees, which littered the streets of Lummus Park.

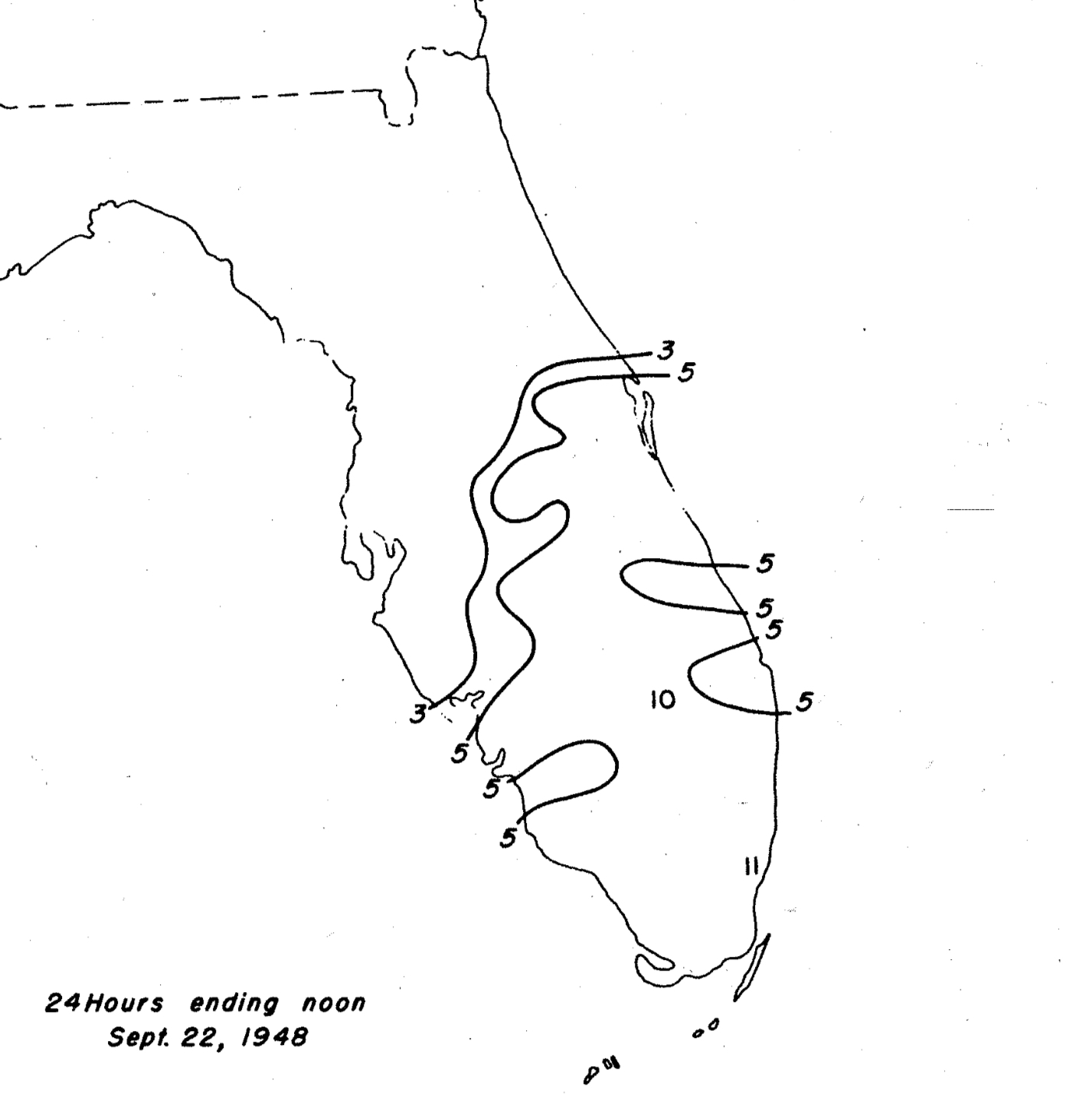
Rainfall totals from the hurricane

The road to the Haulover Bridge in Miami Beach was washed away. Additionally, heavy rainfall caused flooding, with 10 to 11 in (250 to 280 mm) of precipitation in some areas. Around Lake Okeechobee, an average of 8 in (200 mm) of rainfall was observed. Clewiston was inundated with 2 to 3 ft (0.61 to 0.91 m) of water, while LaBelle was submerged for several days. Pasture lands were flooded, drowning some cattle and prompting a massive evacuation of herds to higher ground. Widespread damage to crops, particularly citrus and tropical fruits, was also reported along east coast of Florida as far north as the Indian River.

Throughout Florida, a total of 39 homes were destroyed, while 1,161 others were severely damaged. Further, 40 buildings were demolished and 237 suffered impact. Three deaths were reported in Florida. Additionally, there were 45 injuries requiring hospitalization. Overall, damage in the state totaled about $12 million, with $5 million inflicted to property, $6.5 million to crops, $300,000 to electrical services, and $200,000 to roadway infrastructure, including bridges.

== See also ==
- List of Florida hurricanes (1900–1949)
- Hurricane Donna (1960) A Category 4 hurricane that impacted the same region.
- Hurricane Charley – A hurricane that took a similar path and had a similar intensity.
- Hurricane Irene (1999) – A hurricane that impacted Cuba and South Florida.
- Hurricane Ian – Another hurricane that impacted similar areas.
