= 1948 Atlantic hurricane season =

- Season summary map

Seasonal boundaries
- First system formed: April 15, 1948
- Last system dissipated: November 11, 1948

Strongest storm
- Name: Six and Eight
  - Maximum winds: 130 mph (215 km/h) (1-minute sustained)
  - Lowest pressure: 940 mbar (hPa; 27.76 inHg)

Seasonal statistics
- Total depressions: 15
- Total storms: 10
- Hurricanes: 6
- Major hurricanes (Cat. 3+): 4
- Total fatalities: 112
- Total damage: $28.8 million (1948 USD)

Related articles
- 1942–1948 Pacific hurricane seasons; 1948 Pacific typhoon season; 1940s North Indian Ocean cyclone seasons

The 1948 Atlantic hurricane season featured the first tropical cyclone before the month of June since 1940. The season officially began on June 15, 1948, and lasted until November 15, 1948. These dates conventionally delimit the period of each year when most tropical cyclones form in the Atlantic basin. There were fifteen tropical cyclones; ten systems strengthened into a tropical storm, six storms attained hurricane status, and four storms intensified into major hurricanes, which are Category 3 or higher on the modern-day Saffir–Simpson hurricane wind scale. Operationally, it was believed that a weak tropical disturbance formed over the southeast Bahamas in May and moved northwest into the Georgia coast near Savannah. This system was later excluded from HURDAT. The seventh tropical cyclone was not operationally considered a tropical cyclone, but was later added to HURDAT.

The sixth and eighth systems, designated as Dog and Easy by the Air Weather Service in real time, (Note: The Air Weather Service used the Joint Army/Navy Phonetic Alphabet and designated the third, fourth, fifth, sixth, eighth, ninth, and tenth tropical cyclones as Able, Baker, Charlie, Dog, Easy, Fox, and George, respectively, in real time.) respectively, were the most intense tropical cyclones of the season, peaking as a Category 4 hurricane with a minimum barometric pressure of 940 mbar (27.76 inHg). The former caused eight deaths and $400,000 (1948 USD) (Note: All damage figures are in 1948 USD, unless otherwise noted) in damage after bringing strong winds, rough seas, and heavy rainfall to Bermuda and Atlantic Canada. In Cuba and Florida, the eighth hurricane left 13 fatalities and at least $14 million in damage. The ninth hurricane, assigned the name Fox by the Air Weather Service, brought similar impact to Cuba and Florida about two weeks later. In May, the first tropical cyclone killed 80 people from flooding in the Dominican Republic. Collectively, the storms of this season left around $28.8 million in damage and 112 fatalities.

== Season summary ==
The Atlantic hurricane season officially began on June 15, 1948. However, tropical cyclogenesis began on April 15, about two months before the official start of the season. There was a total of fifteen tropical depressions, ten of which intensified into tropical storms, while six of those became hurricanes. Further, four of the six hurricanes deepened into major hurricanes, which are Category 3 or higher on Saffir–Simpson hurricane wind scale. Of the nine tropical disturbances detected operationally, five struck the United States with winds of 39 mph (63 km/h) or greater, while the other tropical systems affected islands, remained over the open ocean, or affected the country with winds below tropical storm intensity. Three hurricanes made landfall in the United States, while the three other storms with winds of at least 74 mph (119 km/h) largely remained at sea. Collectively, the storms of this season left around $28.8 million in damage and 112 fatalities.

The strongest storms of the season attained Category 4 intensity; two of the major hurricanes formed in the western Caribbean Sea and affected the United States in late September and October. A minimal hurricane struck southern Louisiana on September 4, causing tides of 5 ft (1.5 m) and winds of 78 mph (126 km/h) in New Orleans. A minimal tropical storm made landfall near Destin in July. An intense hurricane attained Category 4 strength and produced extensive damage and 100 mph (160 km/h) wind gusts on Bermuda in mid-September. A Category 4 hurricane struck the Florida Keys and the Everglades in September, resulting in $12 million of damages in the state. After the passage of one week, another hurricane affected the region as a Category 2 storm, after crossing Cuba with winds of 125 mph (201 km/h). Only three direct fatalities occurred in the United States, largely because of improved evacuations and adherence to warnings and advisories.

The season's activity was reflected with an accumulated cyclone energy (ACE) rating of 95. ACE is, broadly speaking, a measure of the power of the hurricane multiplied by the length of time it existed, so storms that last a long time, as well as particularly strong hurricanes, have high ACEs. It is only calculated for full advisories on tropical systems at or exceeding 39 mph (63 km/h), which is tropical storm strength.

== Systems ==
=== Tropical Storm One ===
- Tropical storm (SSHWS)
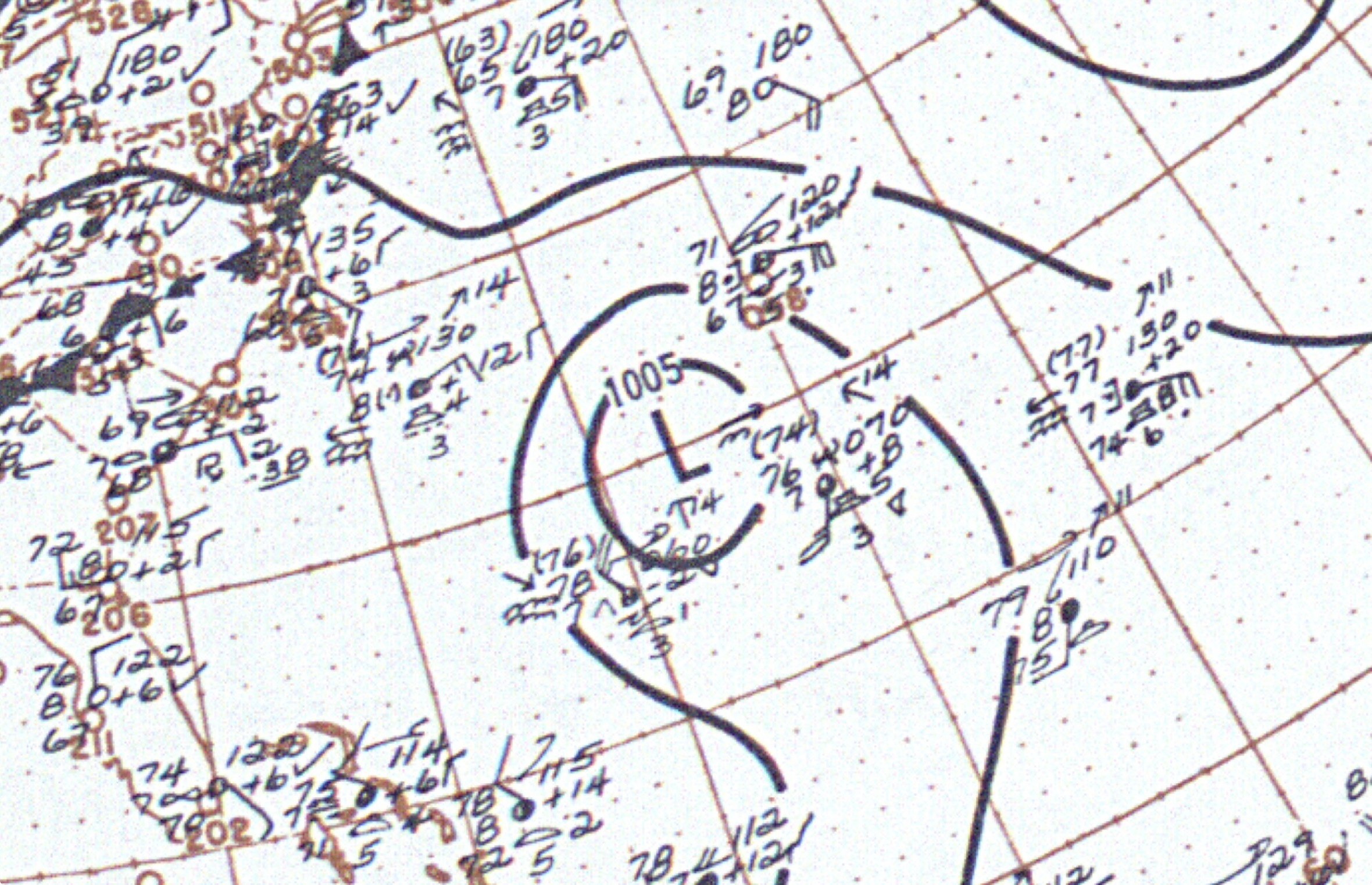
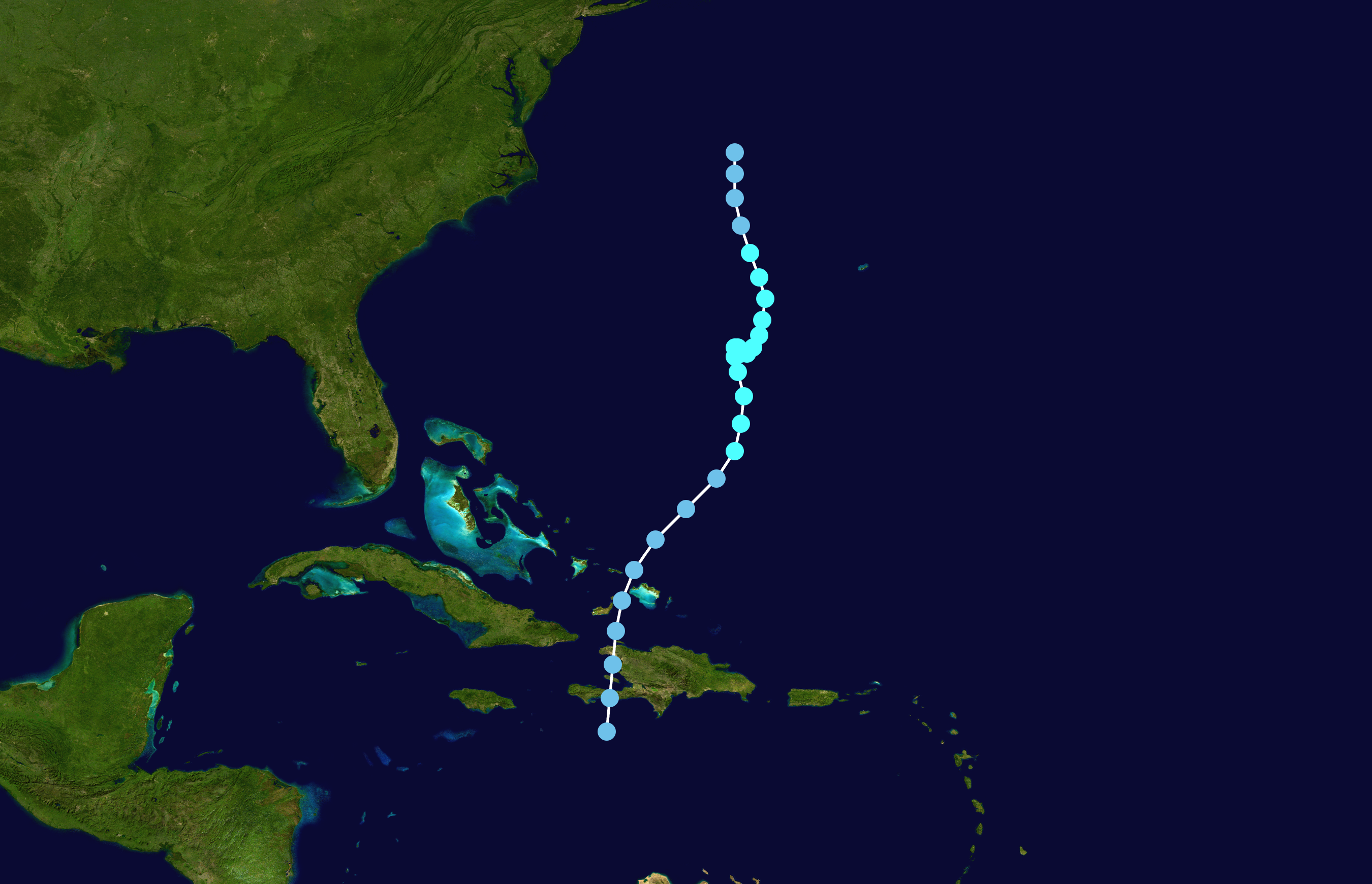
- Duration: May 22 – May 29
- Peak intensity: 50 mph (85 km/h) (1-min); ≤1004 mbar (hPa)

A broad area of low pressure in the central Caribbean Sea developed into a tropical depression early on May 22. The circulation moved northward, and it made landfall in southwest Haiti around 1200 UTC with winds of 35 mph (56 km/h). Over the next day, the system crossed Hispaniola and the Turks and Caicos Islands with winds unchanged. Turning to the northeast, it strengthened into a tropical storm at 1200 UTC on May 24 while over the southwest Atlantic. Shortly afterward, the tropical cyclone turned to the north. On May 25, the storm's forward motion slowed to a crawl; within a few hours, the storm attained its estimated peak intensity of 50 mph (80 km/h), as reported by reconnaissance aircraft, though no ships reported gale-force winds. The next day, the cyclone started to weaken, and on May 27, the system began to accelerate northward. The system diminished to a tropical depression on May 29 shortly prior to dissipation.

The tropical system brought heavy precipitation to Hispaniola, and widespread flooding took place across the region. In the Dominican Republic, the capital city of Santo Domingo (then known as Ciudad Trujillo) was impacted significantly, where 9 in (229 mm) of rain fell in 24 hours. More than 20 bridges were swept away, isolating the city from the rest of the country. Several people went missing in the floodwaters and it is estimated that 80 people died. The storm ranks as the deadliest recorded Atlantic tropical cyclone to form in the off-season.

=== Tropical Storm Two ===
- Tropical storm (SSHWS)
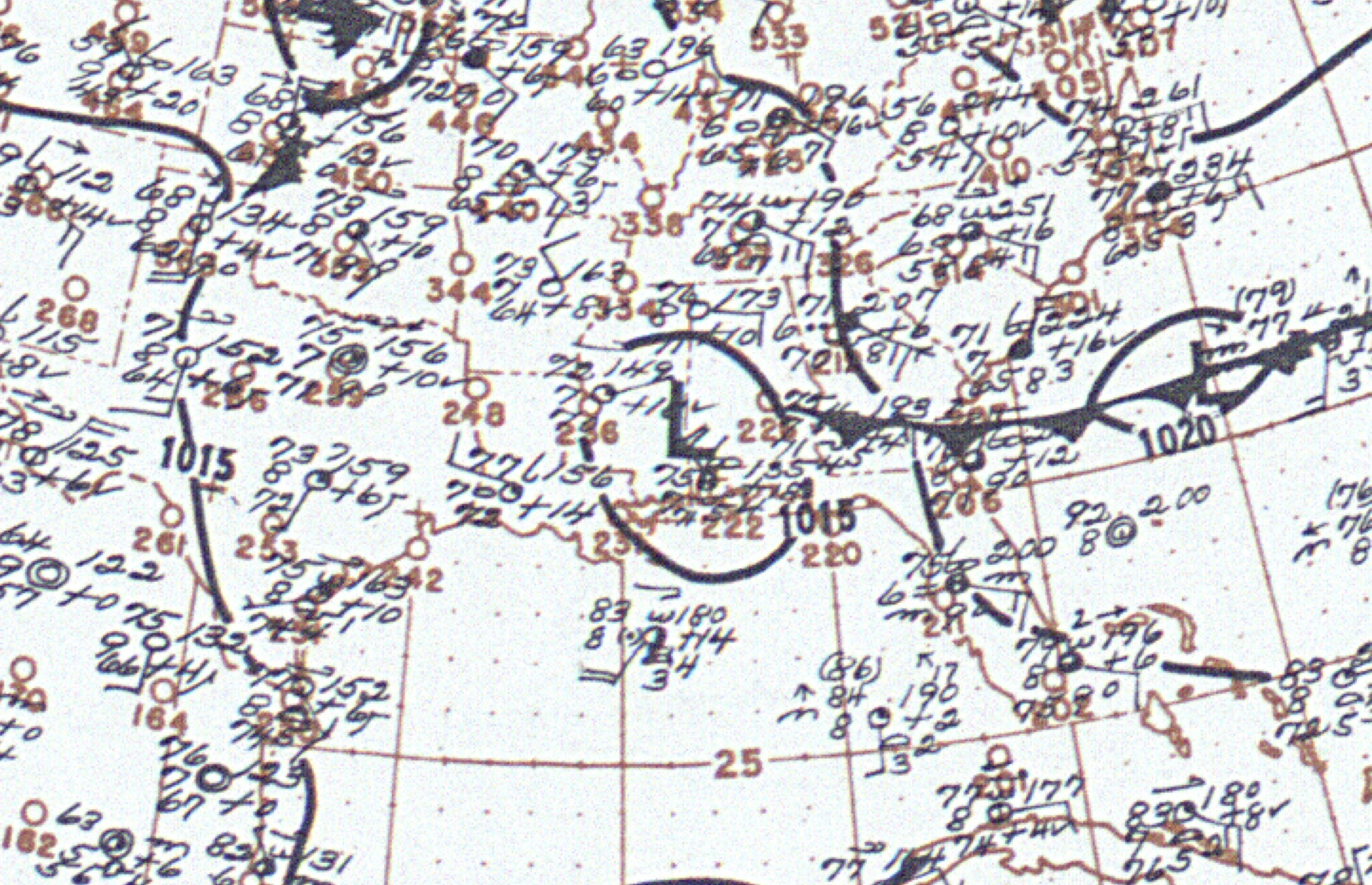
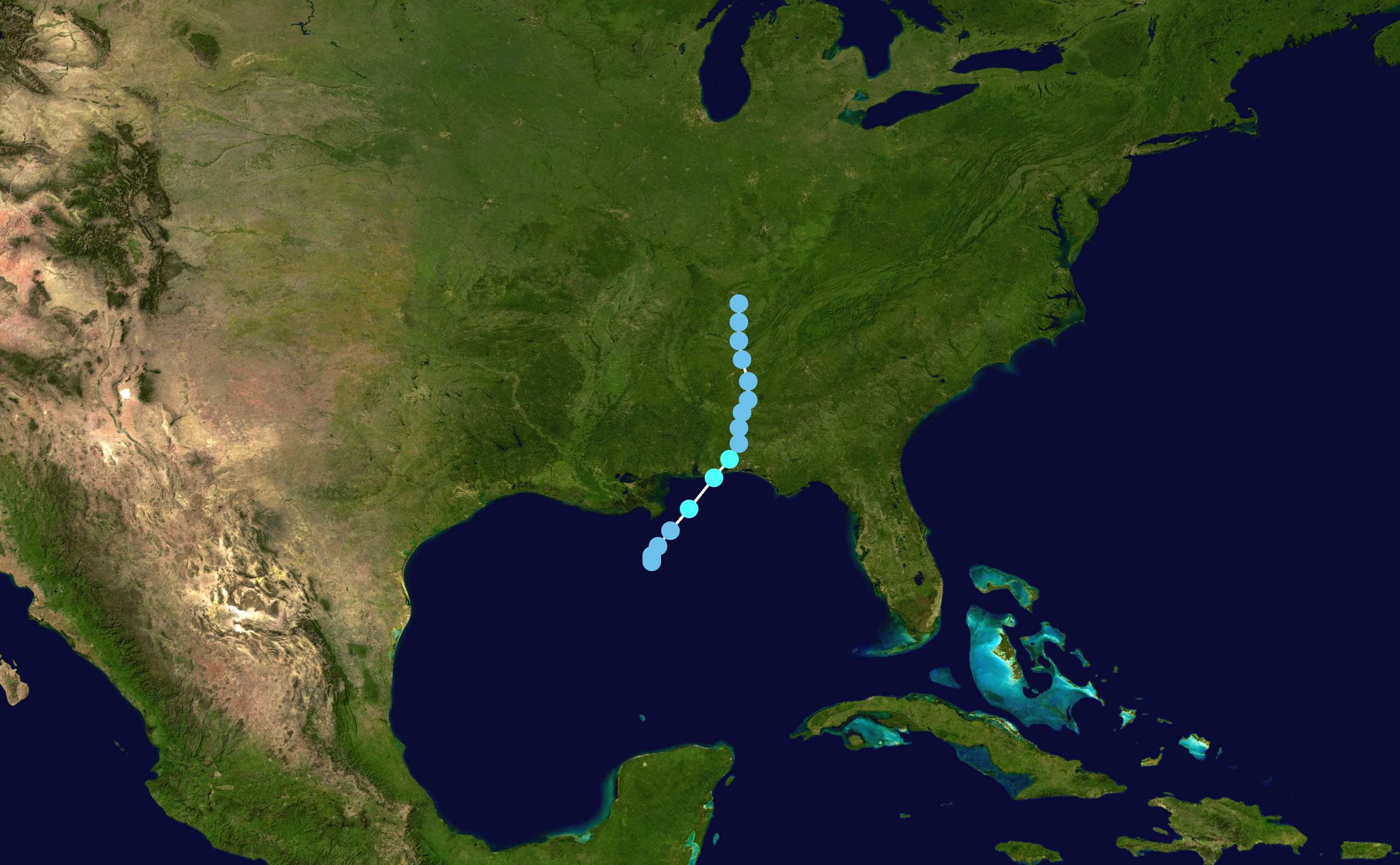
- Duration: July 7 – July 11
- Peak intensity: 40 mph (65 km/h) (1-min); ≤1007 mbar (hPa)

After nearly two months of inactivity, an area of disturbed weather developed in the northern Gulf of Mexico. The area organized into a tropical depression over the north-central Gulf of Mexico on July 7. The depression strengthened slightly and became a weak tropical storm early on July 9, when it peaked with maximum sustained winds of 40 mph (64 km/h). Several hours later, the system made landfall east of Pensacola, Florida, but quickly weakened to a depression as it moved inland. The remnants moved north through southeastern Alabama on July 10, and the circulation dissipated over southern Tennessee on July 11. The system produced minimal effects along the Florida panhandle. Winds of 35 mph (56 km/h) were measured at Pensacola during the passage of a thunderstorm, and the tropical cyclone caused heavy precipitation over northern Florida, southern Alabama, and southern Georgia. Overall damage was minimal.

=== Hurricane Three (Able) ===
- Category 3 hurricane (SSHWS)
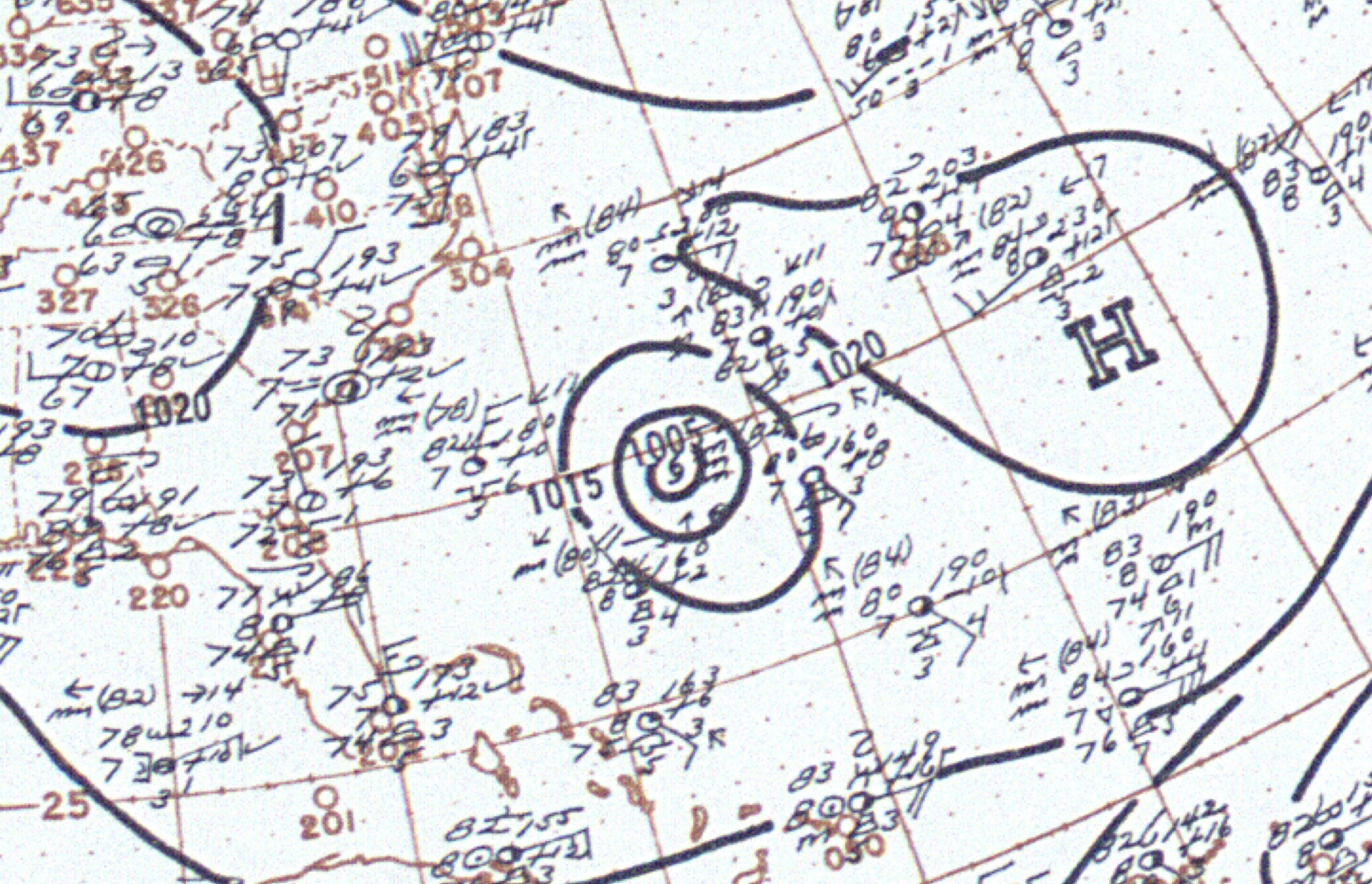
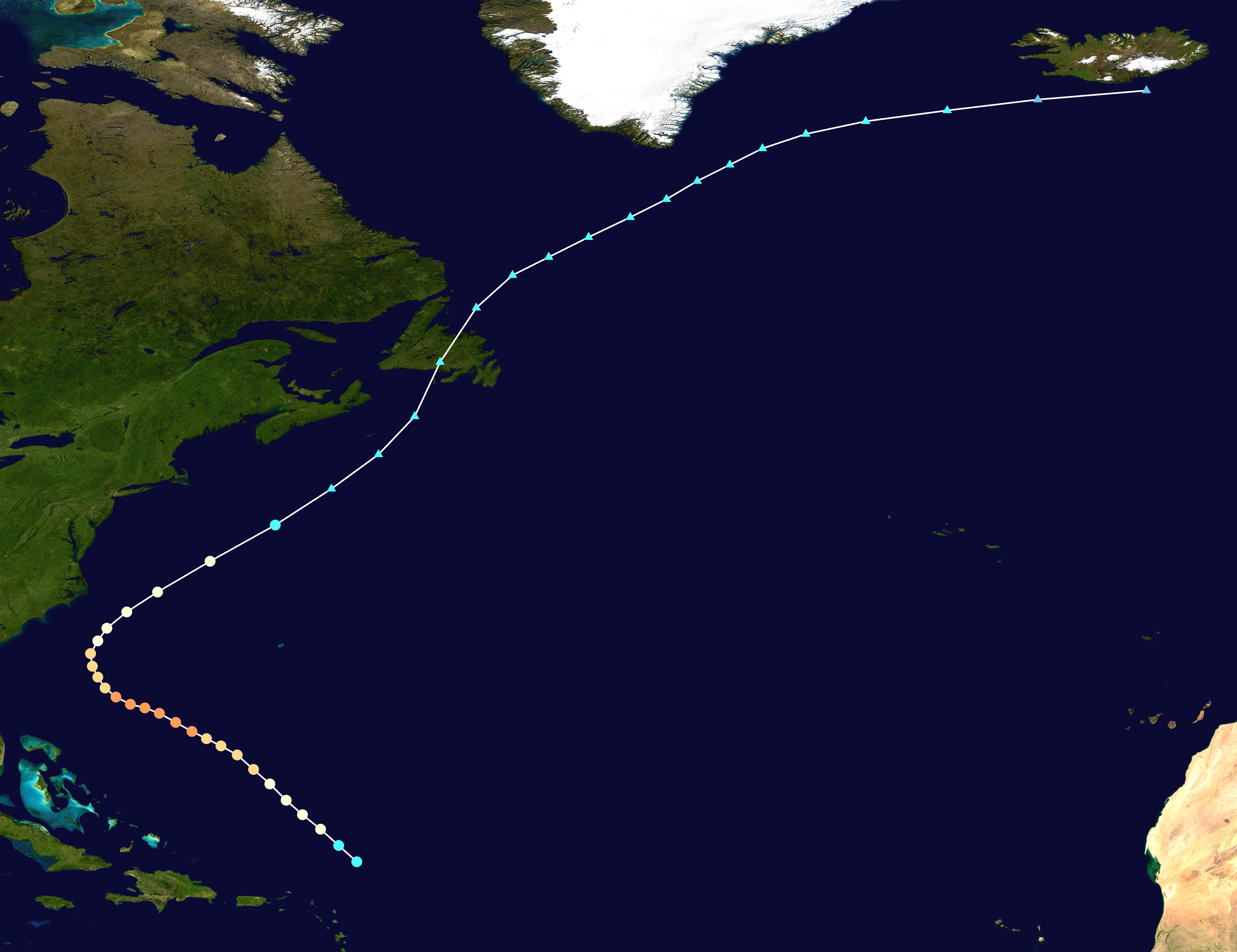
- Duration: August 26 – September 5 (Extratropical on September 1)
- Peak intensity: 120 mph (195 km/h) (1-min); ≤983 mbar (hPa)

A strong tropical storm, named Able by the Air Weather Service in real time, was first identified on August 26 about 300 mi (480 km) northeast of Saint John, as ship reports indicated winds of Force 9. However, it is likely that Able formed much farther east, possibly as a Cape Verde-type hurricane. The tropical cyclone quickly intensified to a hurricane, and it continued to steadily progress northwest. The storm strengthened into a Category 2 hurricane on August 27, and while turning west-northwestward it continued to intensify. The cyclone peaked as a 120 mph (190 km/h) Category 3 hurricane by 1800 UTC on August 28, which was measured by a reconnaissance aircraft flight. Its forward motion slowed on August 29, and it began to weaken as it turned to the north on August 30. The tropical system weakened to a minimal hurricane, and it accelerated to the northeast on August 31. The storm soon became extratropical before striking southern Newfoundland on September 2. Over the next several days, the system slowly weakened, and its remnants turned east before dissipating south of southern Iceland on September 5.

In anticipation of the storm, the U.S. Weather Bureau posted hurricane warnings in North Carolina from Wilmington to Cape Hatteras on August 30, as the storm was expected to pass over or near the state. High tides occurred along the North Carolina coastline, which prompted evacuations and precautions in the area. The remnants of the storm brought strong winds to Atlantic Canada. In Nova Scotia, the storm severely disrupted electricity and communications between Halifax and Sydney. At the latter, many trees were uprooted, with several falling on streets and cars. In Newfoundland, a wind gust as strong as 81 mph (130 km/h) was observed. The community of Port au Port was hard hit. Among the structures damaged included a store, which lost its roof, and a church, which the storm completely destroyed. Port au Port alone suffered about $200,000 (1948 CAD) in damage. Along the shore, a number of pleasure crafts were wrecked. Some other structures, trees, and boats were impacted or destroyed throughout the province. The communities along the south coast of Newfoundland collectively experienced about $400,000 (1948 CAD) in damage. Overall, the storm left over $989,000 (1948 CAD) in damage in Canada.

=== Tropical Storm Four (Baker) ===
- Tropical storm (SSHWS)
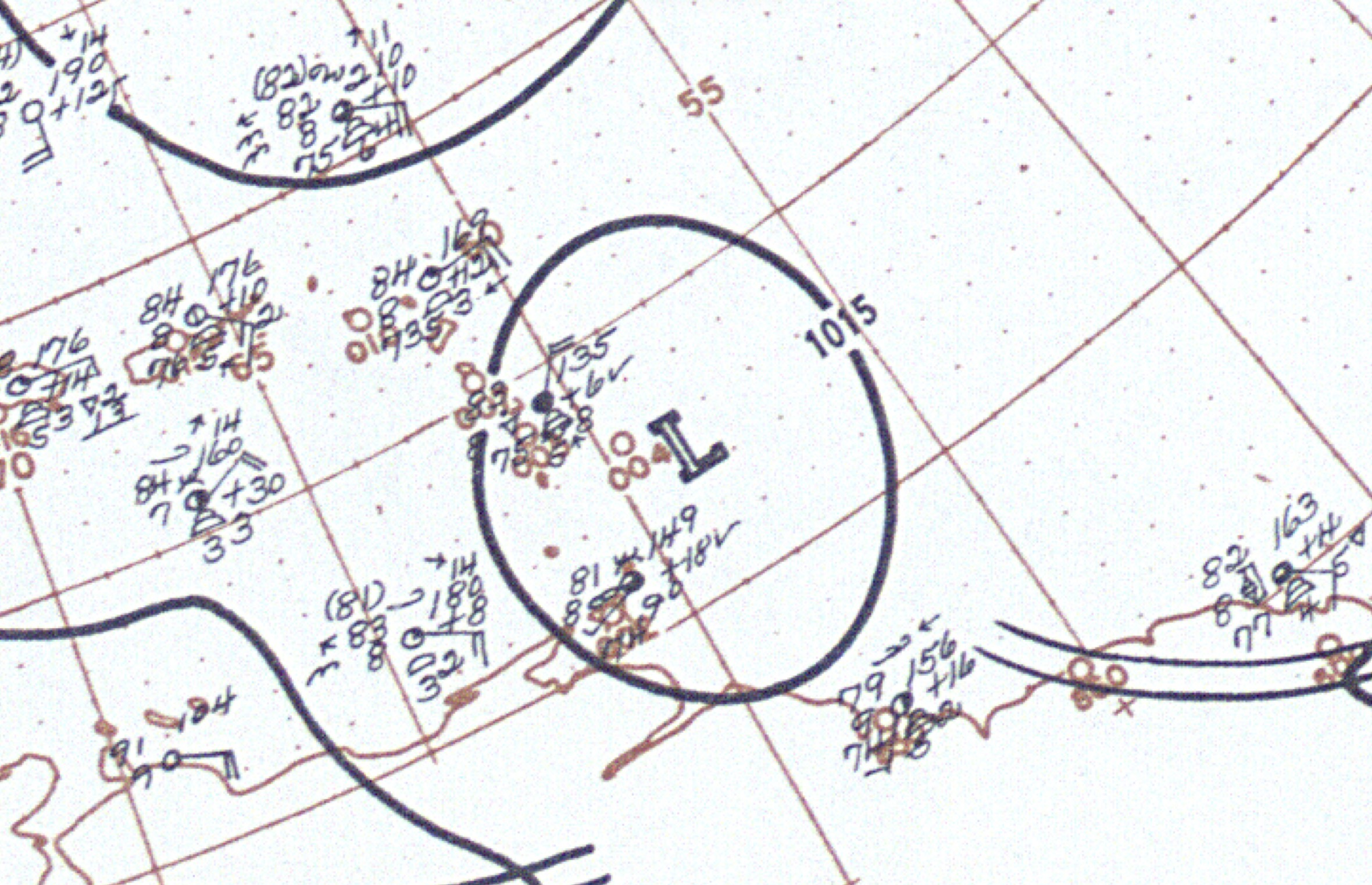
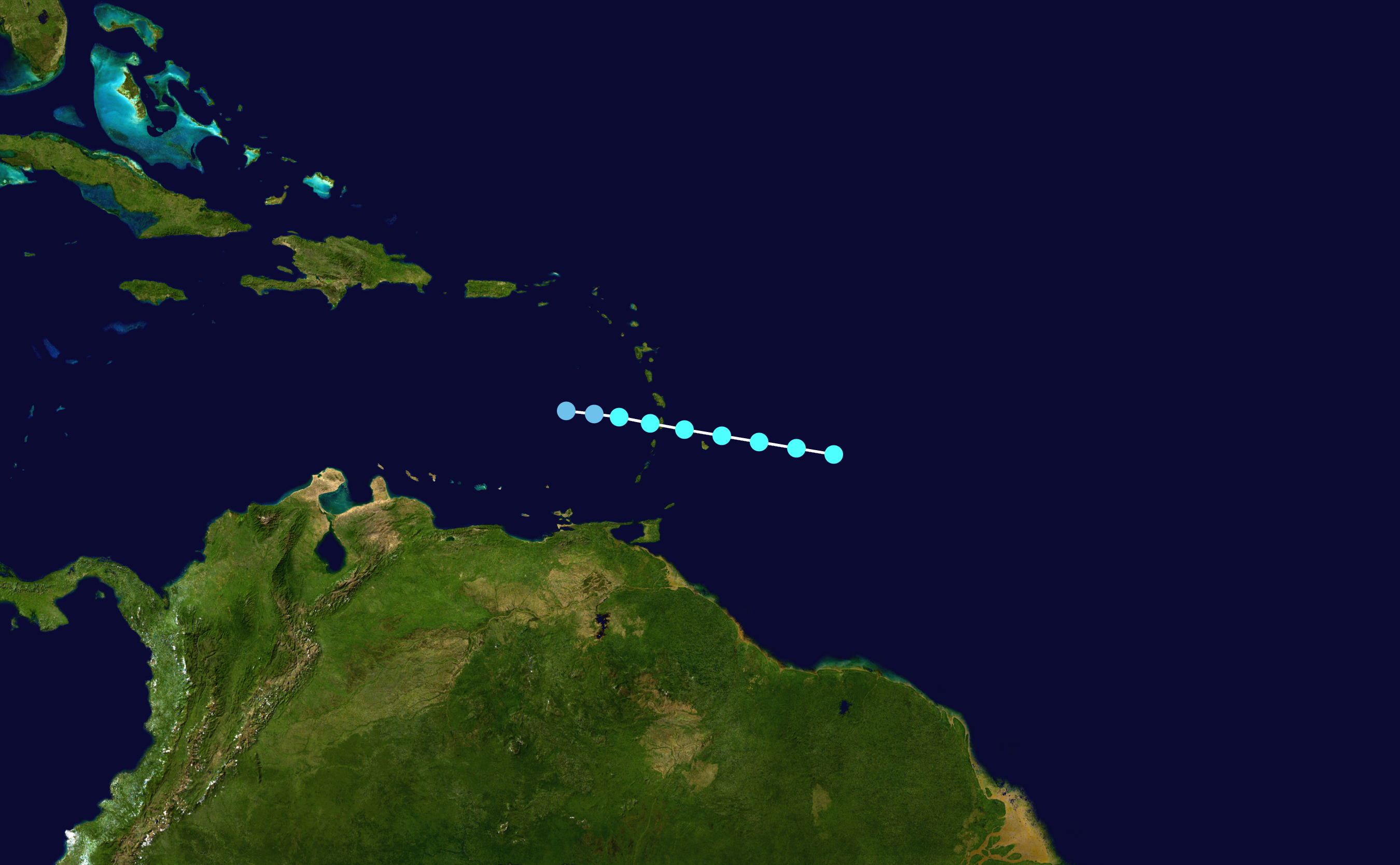
- Duration: August 30 – September 1
- Peak intensity: 60 mph (95 km/h) (1-min); ≤1007 mbar (hPa)

On August 30, a tropical storm named Baker by the Air Weather Service in real time, was first detected about 275 mi (443 km) east of Barbados, by a ship that reported high easterly seas and winds of Force 10. Upon being initially observed, Baker was already at its peak maximum sustained winds of 60 mph (97 km/h). The small system moved rapidly westward and slowly weakened to a marginal tropical cyclone on August 31. On the morning of September 1, Baker passed between Saint Lucia and Martinique, when a reconnaissance aircraft mission reported a minimum pressure of 1,007 mbar (29.7 inHg). Subsequent missions failed to detect a center of circulation, and the tropical cyclone quickly degenerated to a tropical depression. Baker dissipated over the eastern Caribbean Sea on September 1. The storm brought heavy rainfall to several eastern Caribbean islands, though most of it was beneficial. On Puerto Rico, water supplies and crops were replenished. Winds on Dominica interrupted telephone communications, while rough seas drove a ship ashore.

=== Hurricane Five (Charlie) ===
- Category 1 hurricane (SSHWS)
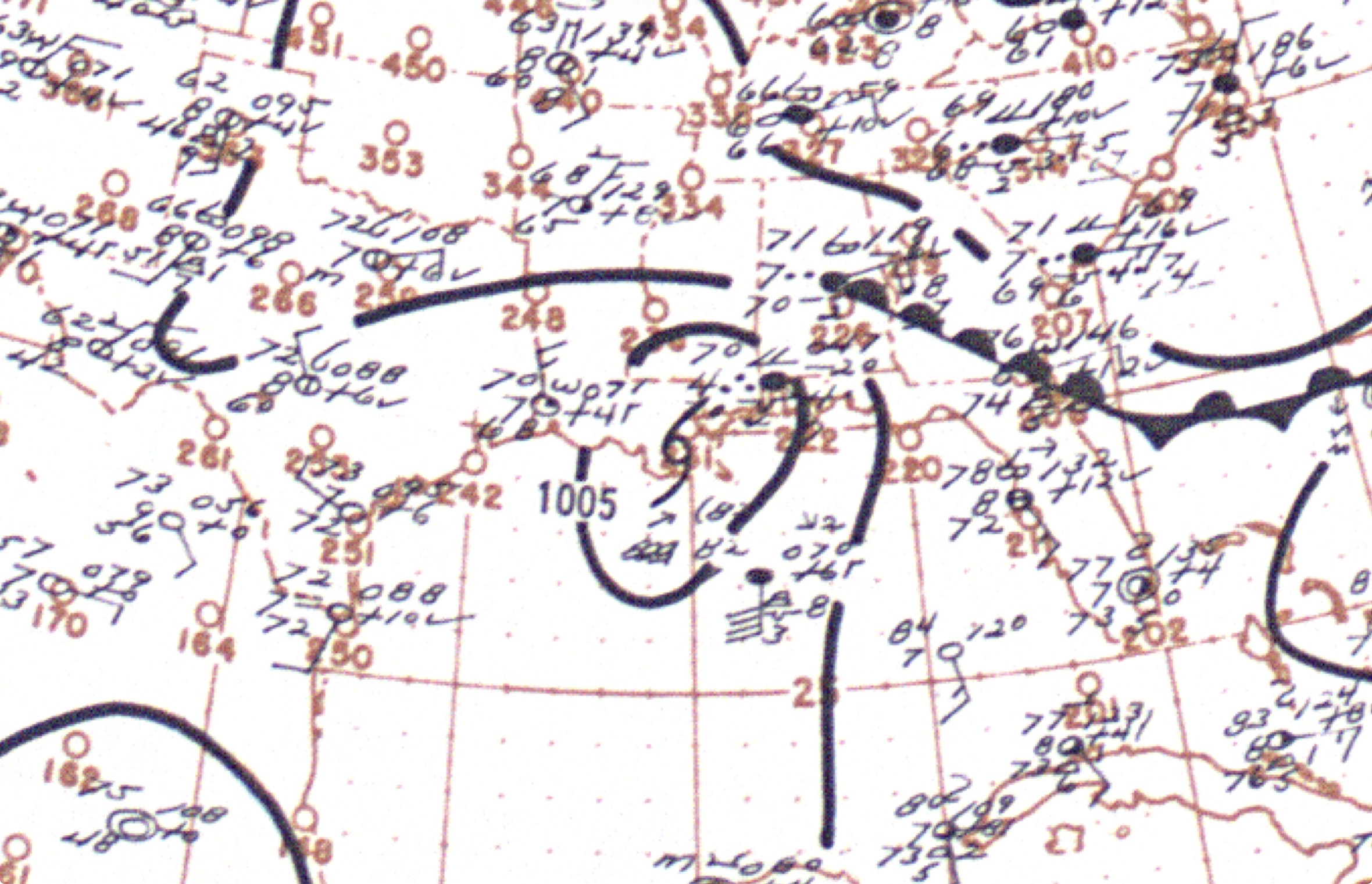
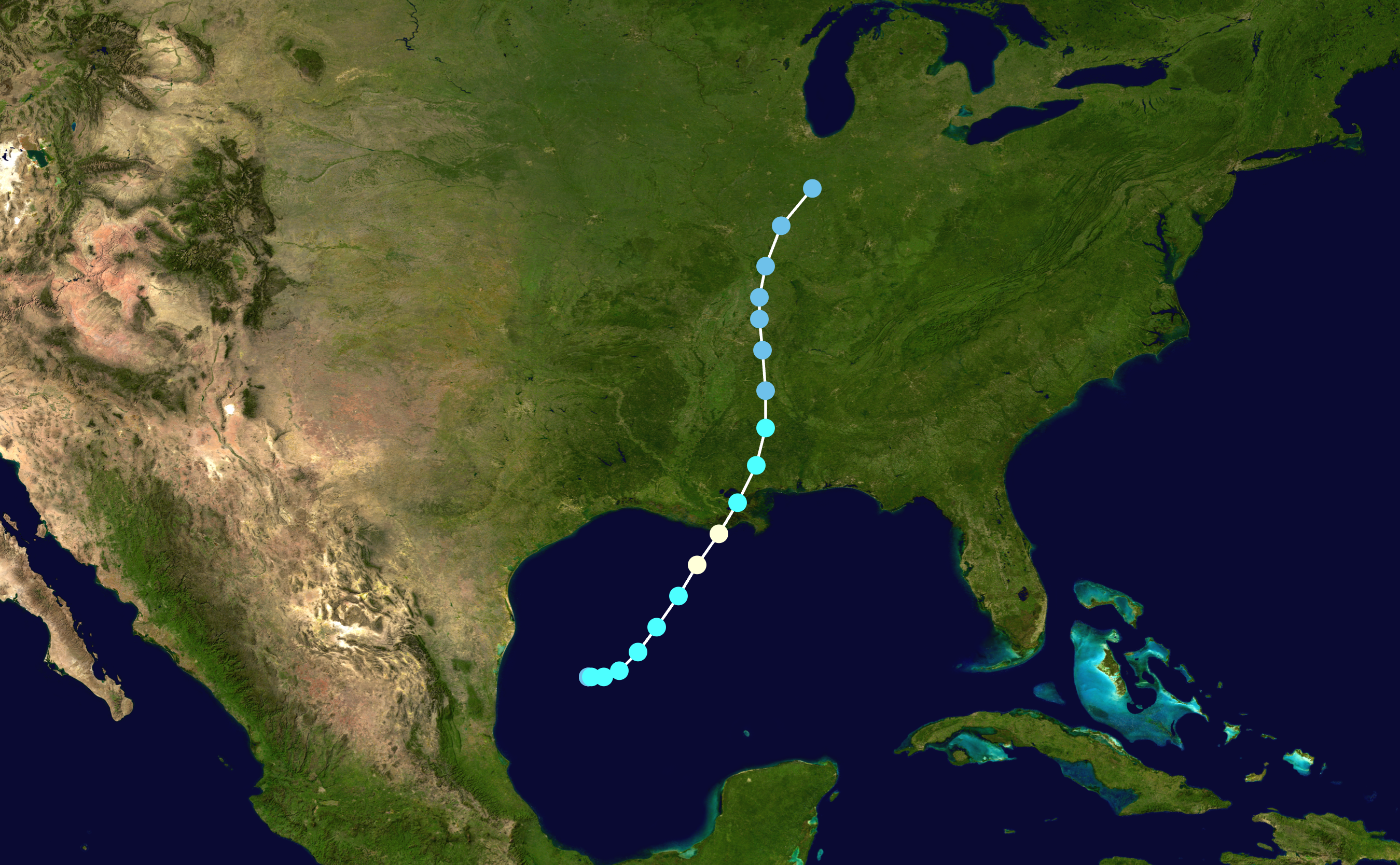
- Duration: September 1 – September 6
- Peak intensity: 80 mph (130 km/h) (1-min); 983 mbar (hPa)

An area of disturbed weather organized into a 39 mph (63 km/h) tropical storm – named Charlie by the Air Weather Service in real time – on September 1 over the western Gulf of Mexico. On the morning of September 2, the poorly defined center moved northeast, and Charlie gradually intensified. It attained hurricane intensity on September 3 and then slowly accelerated toward the upper Gulf Coast. It rapidly reached its peak intensity of 80 mph (130 km/h), and it crossed the coastline west of Golden Meadow, Louisiana, on September 4. The center moved inland over Orleans Parish, and the weakening tropical cyclone diminished to a strong tropical storm prior to moving over southern Mississippi. Charlie continued to weaken and fell to tropical depression intensity on September 5. The remnants turned to the north, and the circulation dissipated over northwestern Indiana on September 6.

On September 4, the U.S. Weather Bureau advised residents that the storm was expected to strike land between Morgan City and Grand Isle around midnight, as its forward motion had increased to 15 mph (24 km/h). The weather service also noted that abnormally high tides were expected from the Mississippi River to Pensacola, as the center was predicted to pass east of New Orleans and move to the west of Biloxi shortly before dawn. About 1,000 people left their homes in Terrebonne Parish and took shelter in a courthouse and school buildings in Houma. As winds increased, city officials in New Orleans ordered 2,000 people to evacuate from a wartime housing project into an auditorium for shelter. Offshore, oil drilling platforms and equipment were destroyed by high seas near Grand Isle. The island itself was cut off from the mainland after 5 ft (1.5 m) inundated roadways.

Throughout southeastern Louisiana, beans were destroyed north of Lake Pontchartrain, while sugar cane and corn were flattened, especially in Lafourche, Jefferson, St. Charles, and Terrebonne parishes. Pecan and tung nut crops also suffered damage in southeastern Mississippi. The hurricane produced gusts of 78 mph (126 km/h) at Moisant Airport, and tides ranged from 3.4 to 6 ft (1.0 to 1.8 m) along the coast from Mississippi to the Florida panhandle. The maximum tide reached 4.7 ft (1.4 m) in New Orleans, and winds caused damage to small boats, trees, and power and communication lines. The remnants of the hurricane brought rainfall far inland, including 0.82 in (21 mm) of precipitation observed in Detroit, Michigan. Total damage in the United States reached $900,000.

=== Hurricane Six (Dog) ===
- Category 4 hurricane (SSHWS)
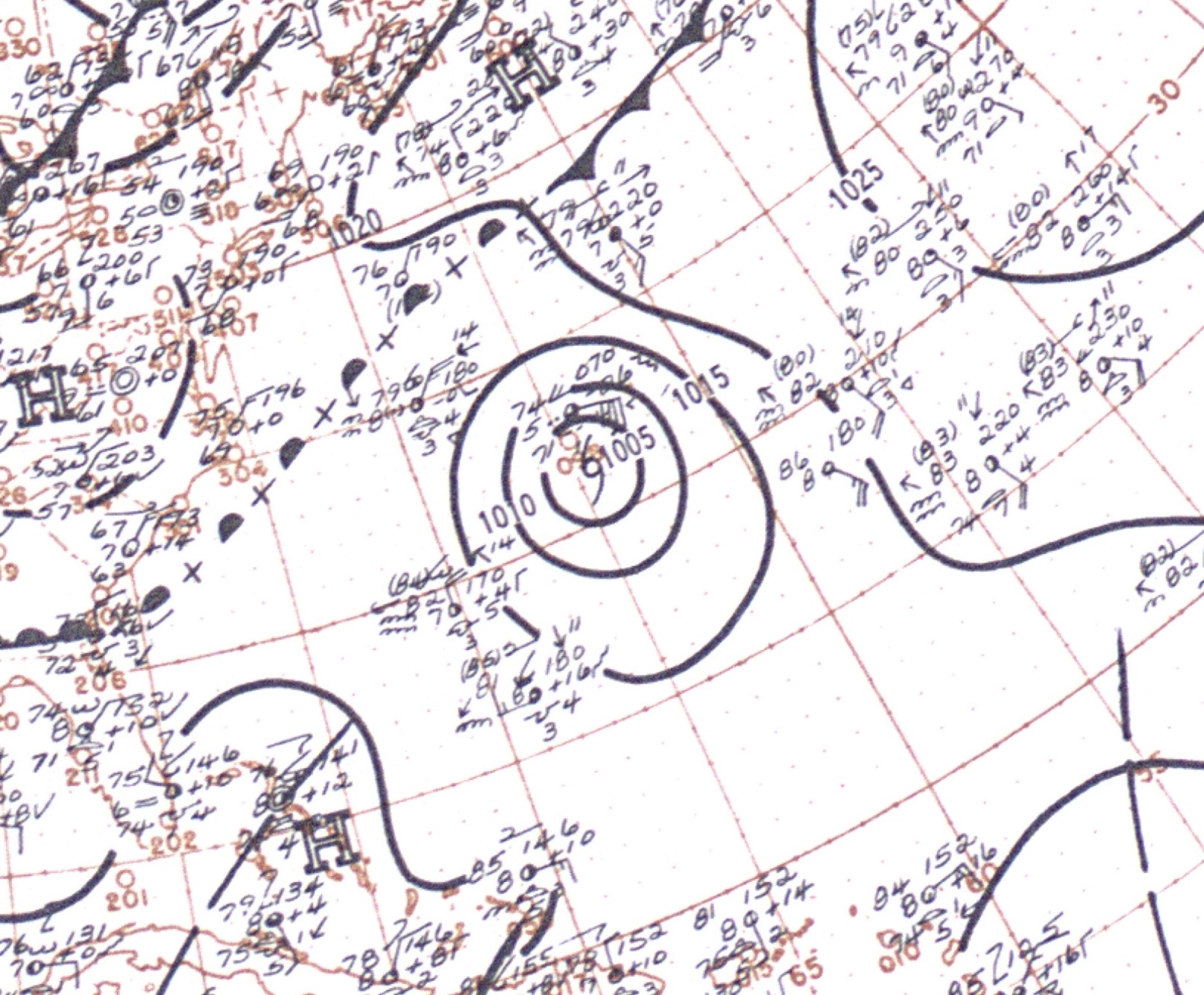
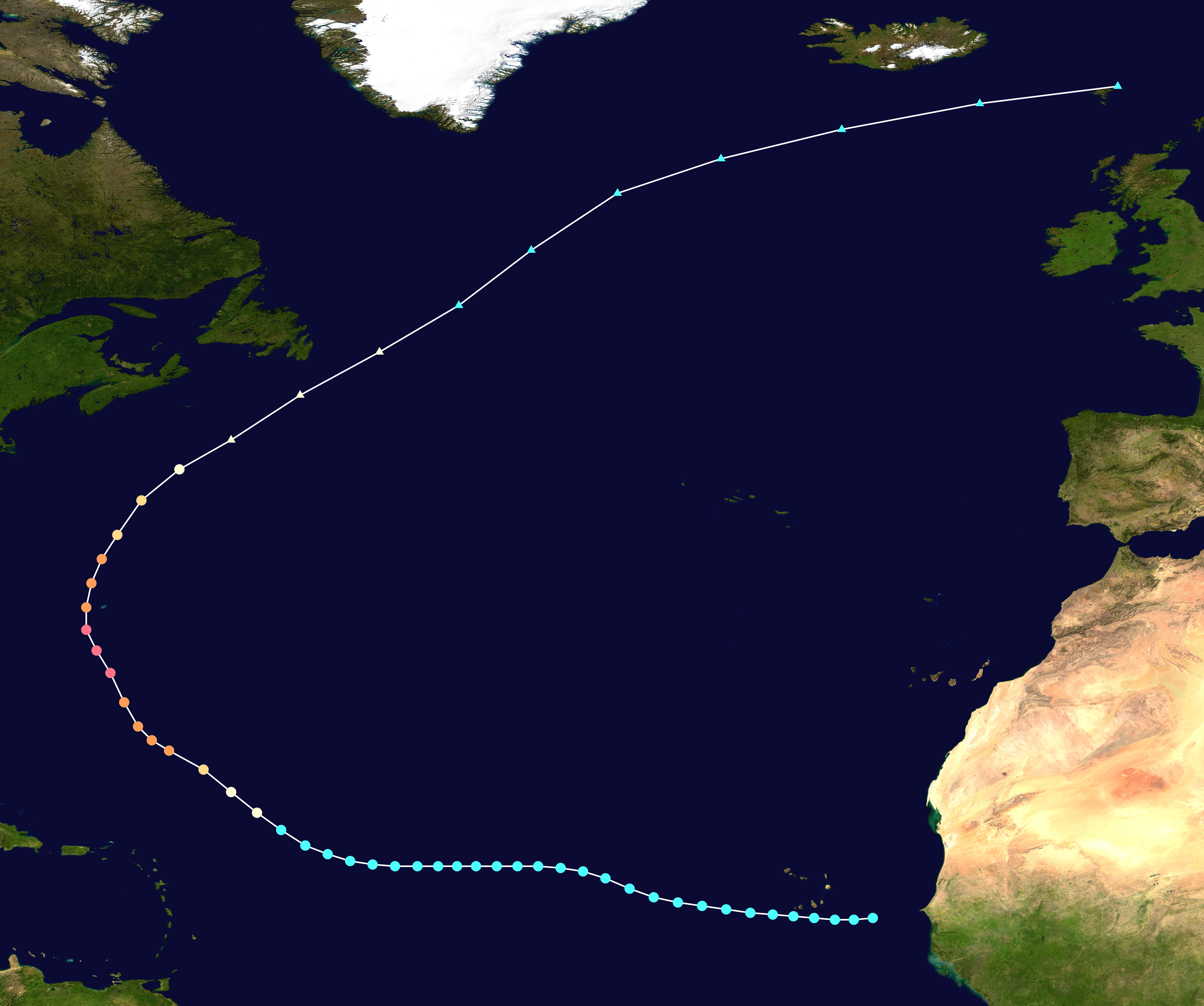
- Duration: September 4 – September 17 (Extratropical on September 15)
- Peak intensity: 130 mph (215 km/h) (1-min); ≤940 mbar (hPa)

A tropical wave moved off the west coast of Africa on September 3 and was designated as Tropical Storm Dog by the Air Weather Service in real time on the following day. The cyclone tracked a general westward path for much of its initial stages as it gradually intensified, reaching tropical storm intensity shortly after development and then hurricane intensity a day later. After reaching a longitude roughly equal to that of the Lesser Antilles, Dog began to curve northward on a parabolic track, bringing it near Bermuda at peak intensity as a Category 4 hurricane on September 13. The hurricane then began to accelerate northeastward and weaken. The waning Dog grazed Cape Race, Newfoundland, before transitioning into an extratropical cyclone on September 15; these remnants persisted for an additional day.

Although the storm never making landfall, Dog disrupted numerous shipping lanes and inflicted damage on Bermuda and Newfoundland. In the former, the hurricane brought winds in excess of 100 mph (160 km/h), downing power lines and trees. Property damage also resulted from the strong winds, totaling about $400,000. After passing west of Bermuda, the tropical cyclone tracked across numerous shipping lanes. Two ships, the Leicester and Gaspar, encountered the hurricane and became stricken in open waters. Though most people were rescued from both ships, six people perished on the former while one died on the latter. Beginning on September 15, the hurricane tracked east of Newfoundland, producing heavy rainfall on land. The precipitation flooded roads and caused streams to overflow, inundating additional areas. On the island, one person were killed. Overall, the hurricane caused eight fatalities.

=== Tropical Storm Seven ===
- Tropical storm (SSHWS)
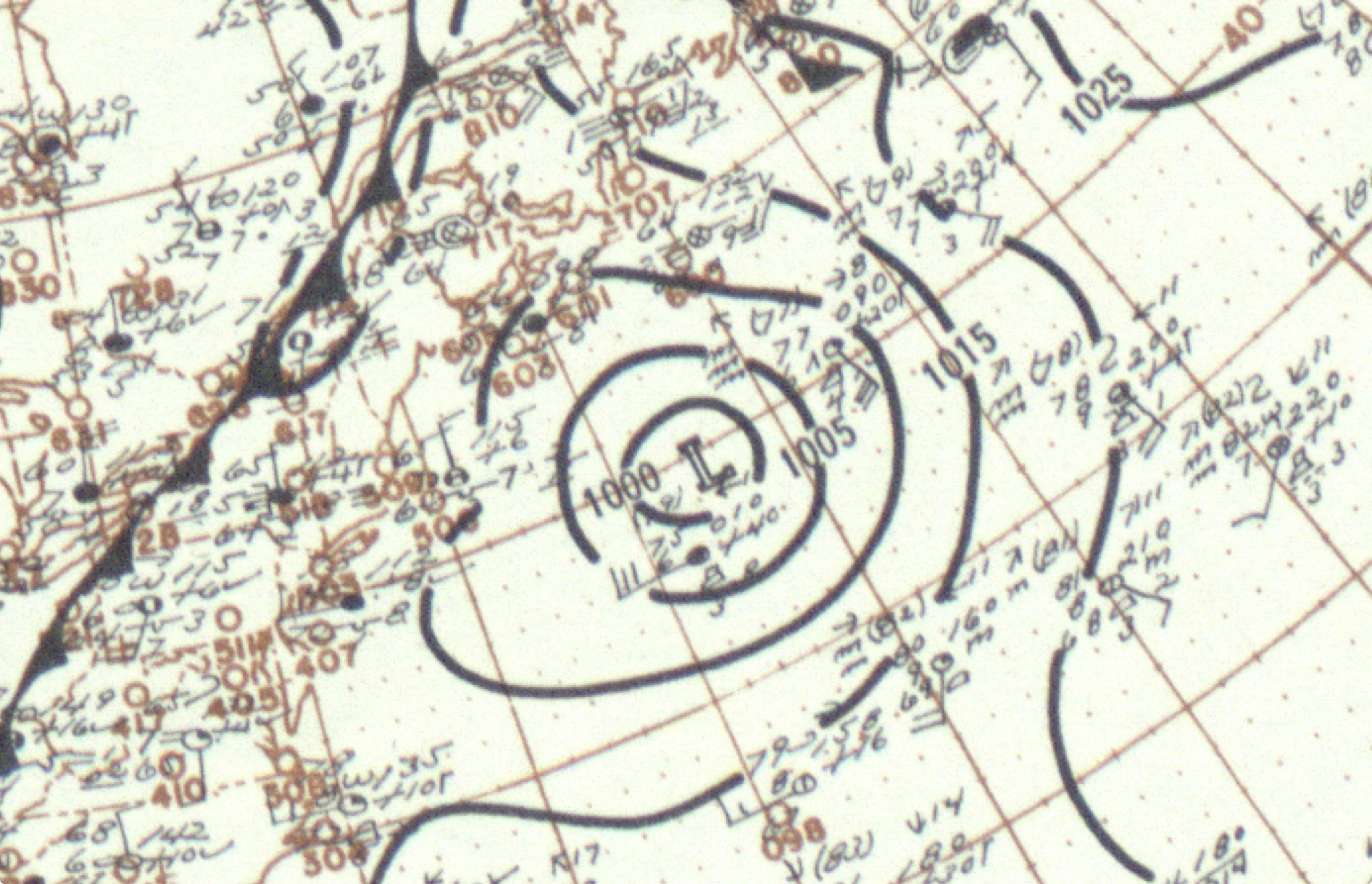
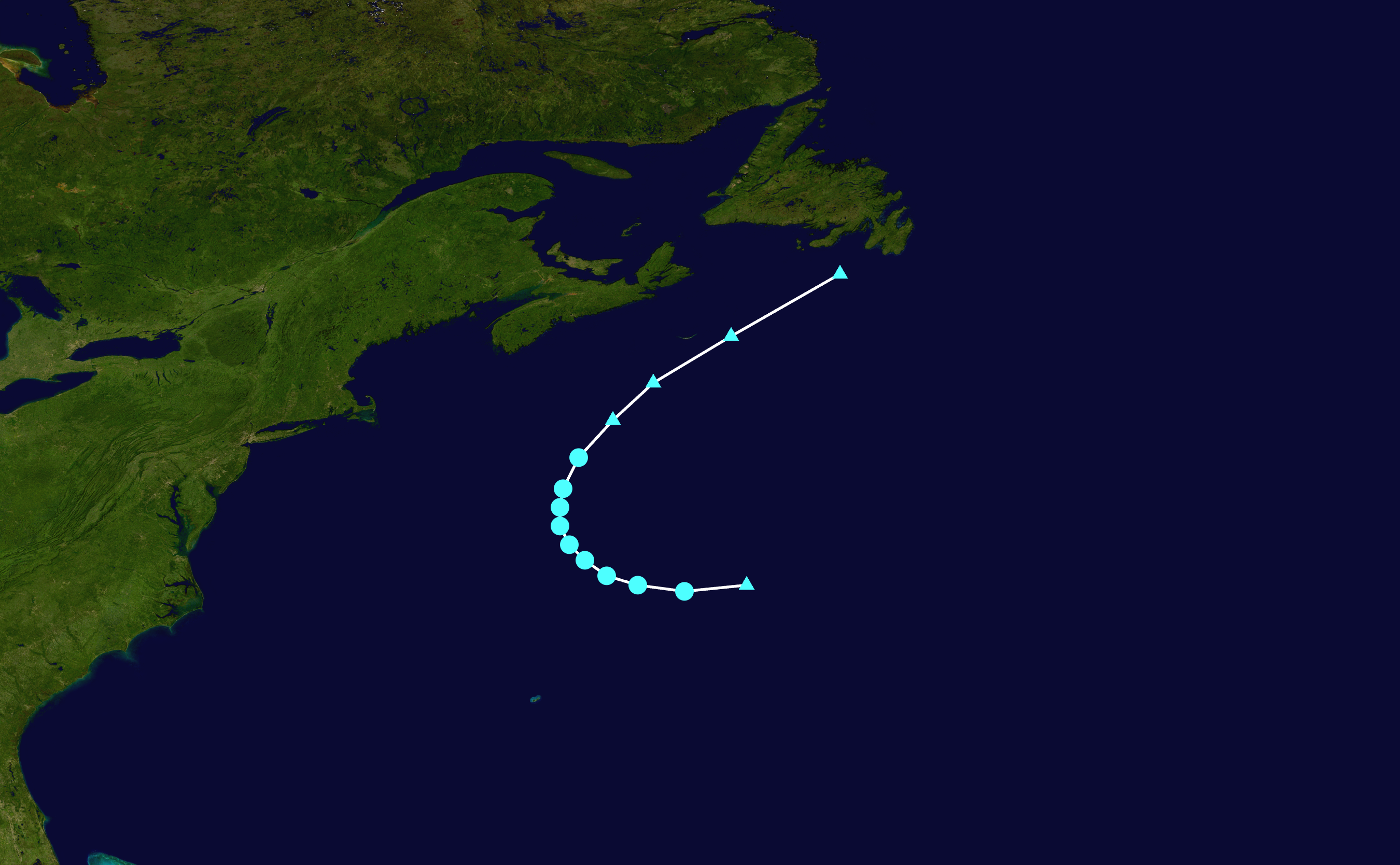
- Duration: September 7 – September 10
- Peak intensity: 65 mph (100 km/h) (1-min); ≤993 mbar (hPa)

Operationally, this storm was not considered a tropical cyclone. Late on September 7, an extratropical system transitioned into a tropical storm about 355 mi (571 km) northeast of Bermuda. The storm curved northwestward and peaked with maximum sustained winds of 65 mph (105 km/h) and a minimum barometric pressure of 993 mbar (29.3 inHg). After turning northward and then northeastward, the storm began losing tropical characteristics and reverted to an extratropical cyclone on September 10 while situated about 215 mi (346 km) southwest of Sable Island, Nova Scotia. The remnants continued northeastward until dissipating just offshore Newfoundland.

=== Hurricane Eight (Easy) ===
- Category 4 hurricane (SSHWS)
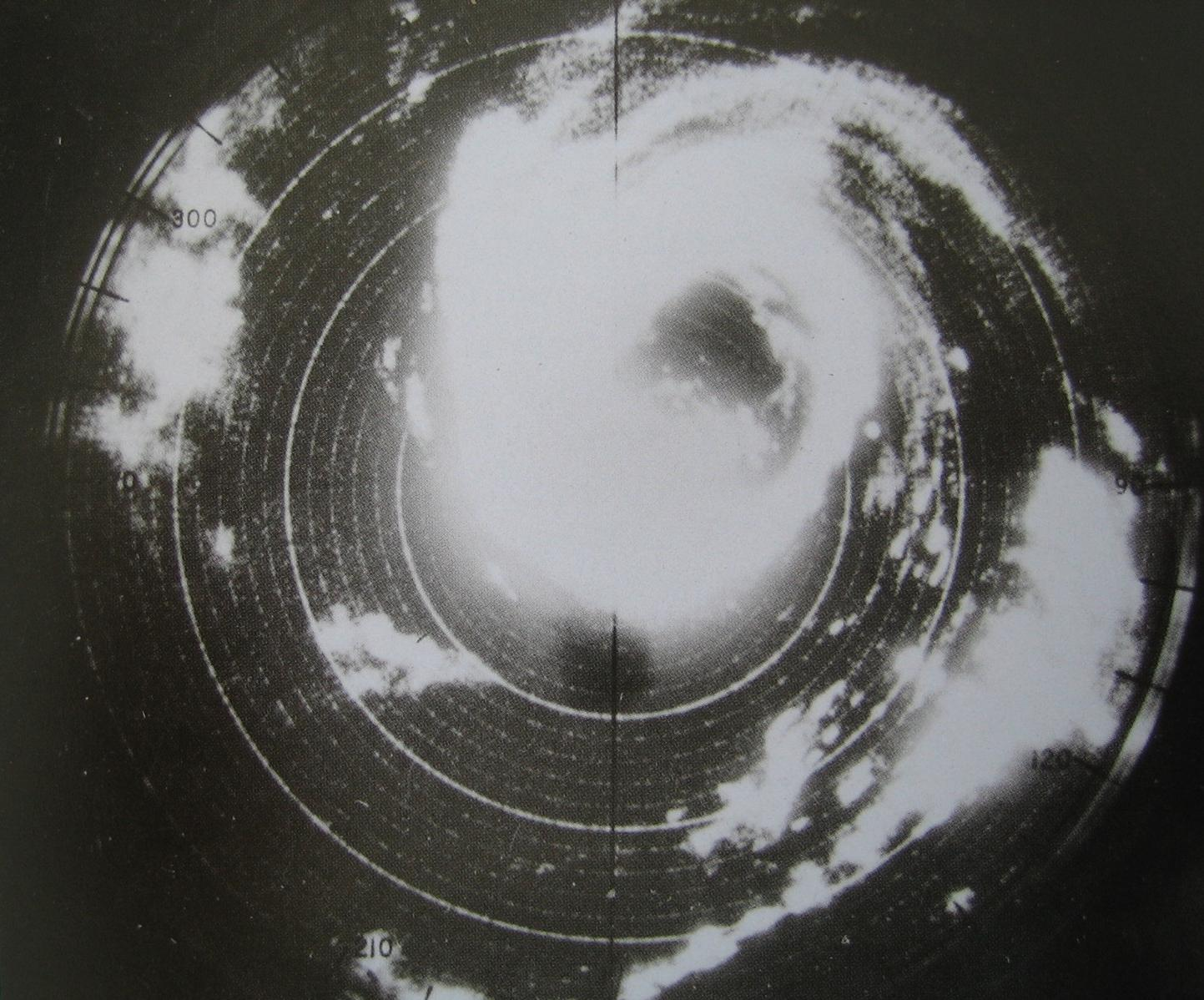
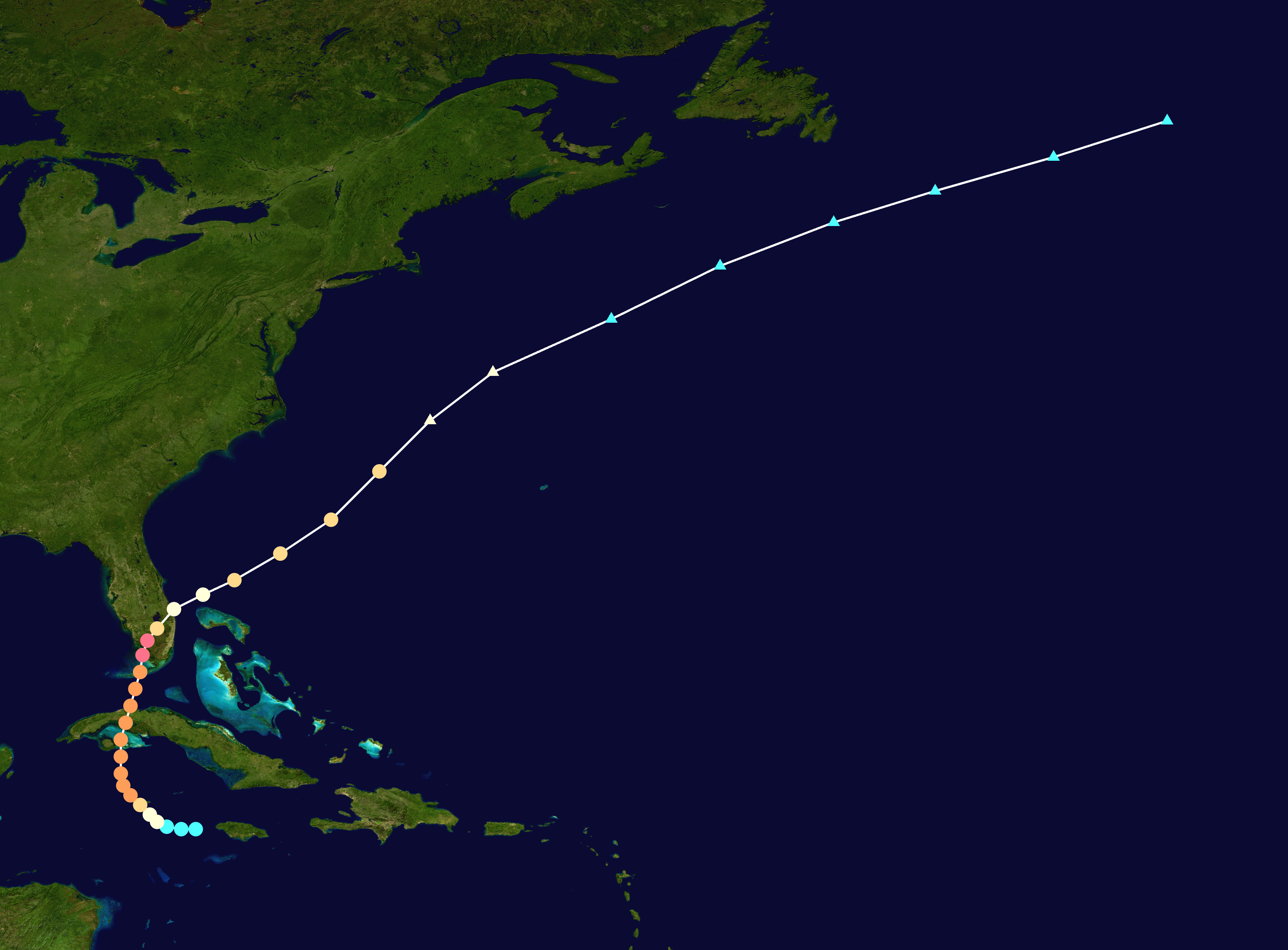
- Duration: September 18 – September 26 (Extratropical on September 24)
- Peak intensity: 130 mph (215 km/h) (1-min); 940 mbar (hPa)

The eighth storm, designated as Tropical Storm Easy by the Air Weather Service in real time, developed from a tropical wave over the Caribbean Sea on September 18. Early the next day, Easy strengthened into a hurricane while moving westward. Thereafter, it curved northwestward and continued to deepen. By September 20, the system turned northward and later that day made landfall along the Zapata Peninsula of Cuba as a Category 3 hurricane on the modern day Saffir–Simpson hurricane wind scale. Another landfall occurred in Cuba early the next day to the south of Güines. Severe destruction was reported on the island, with winds up to 90 mph (140 km/h) observed in Havana. Over 700 buildings were destroyed. Ten deaths occurred and damage totaled at least $2 million, while other sources estimate "several million dollars."

After emerging into the Straits of Florida on September 21, Easy resumed intensification, before striking near Boca Chica Key, Florida, with winds of 120 mph (190 km/h). By early on September 22, the system peaked as a Category 4 hurricane with sustained winds of 130 mph (210 km/h). Shortly thereafter, another landfall occurred near Chokoloskee at the same intensity. Severe damage was reported in the state due to strong winds. The storm was considered the worst in Key West since 1919. Throughout the state, 1,200 homes were severely damaged or destroyed, while 40 businesses were demolished and 237 suffered impact. There were three deaths and about $12 million in damage, over half of which was inflicted on crops. The storm rapidly weakened while crossing the state and emerged into the Atlantic Ocean as only a Category 1 hurricane later on September 22. Slight fluctuations in intensity occurred before the hurricane became extratropical early on September 24, while located northwest of Bermuda. The remnants accelerated to the east-northeastward and continued to weaken, before dissipating hundreds of miles east of Newfoundland on September 26.

=== Hurricane Nine (Fox) ===
- Category 3 hurricane (SSHWS)
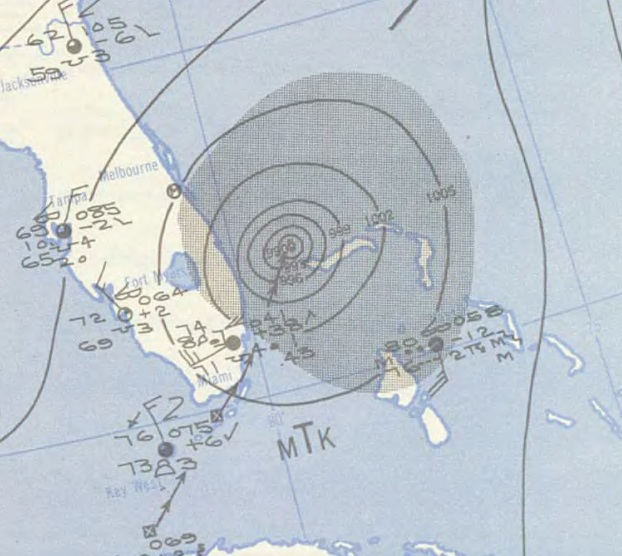
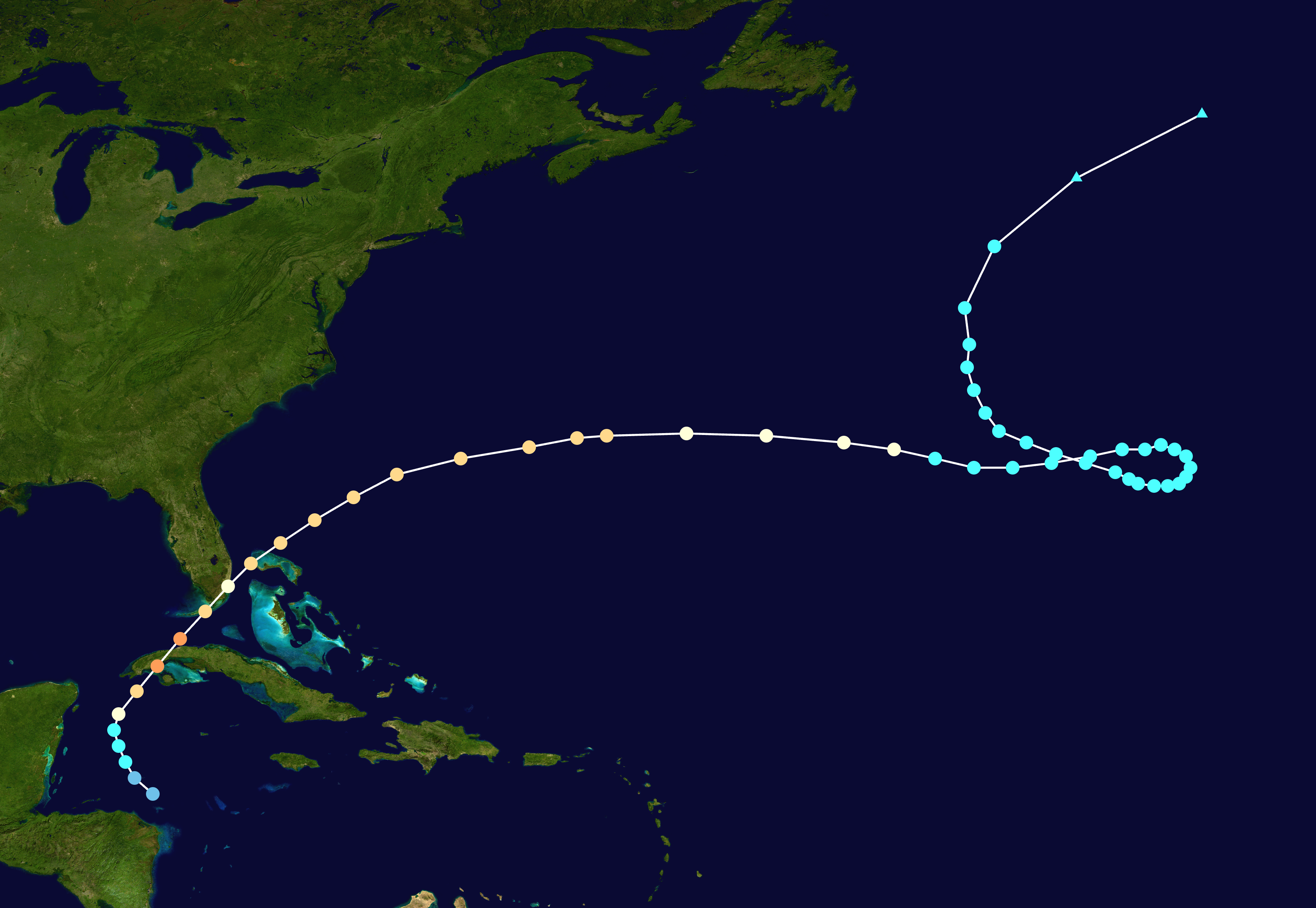
- Duration: October 3 – October 16
- Peak intensity: 125 mph (205 km/h) (1-min); ≤971 mbar (hPa)

On October 3, a tropical depression developed over the northwestern Caribbean Sea. The storm intensified into a tropical storm, designated as Tropical Storm Fox by the Air Weather Service in real time, early on October 4. Several hours later, the storm became a hurricane. Fox then significantly deepened, peaking as a Category 3 intensity with maximum sustained winds of 125 mph (201 km/h) early on October 5. Around that time, Fox made landfall in eastern Pinar del Río Province of Cuba. Fox crossed the island and emerged into the Straits of Florida a few hours later. Late on October 5, the hurricane made landfall on Bahia Honda Key, Florida, with winds of 105 mph (169 km/h) and near Flamingo about two hours later. Fox emerged into the Atlantic Ocean near Fort Lauderdale early on October 6. The storm moved northeastward and later curved to the east-northeast. Late on October 7, Fox made landfall on Bermuda with winds of 105 mph (169 km/h). Fox weakened over the next several days and later executed a large cyclonic loop. By October 16, it became extratropical while well east-southeast of Newfoundland.

In Cuba, homes and cattle were swept away by flash flooding. Eleven deaths and about 300 injuries were attributed to the tropical cyclone. Damage in the country reached about $6 million. The storm brought strong winds to Florida, with a sustained wind speed of 122 mph (196 km/h) at Naval Air Station Key West. Heavy rainfall exceeding 9.5 in (240 mm) in Miami and three tornadoes also contributed to the damage in South Florida. Throughout the state, 674 homes were severely damaged or destroyed, while 45 other buildings were demolished. Overall, damage in Florida reached $5.5 million and there were no deaths, but 36 injuries, none of which were serious. In Bermuda, buildings were unroofed and the sides of some structures were knocked down. Electrical light wires and telephone lines were toppled across the island. Damage totaled over $1 million.

=== Hurricane Ten (George) ===
- Category 1 hurricane (SSHWS)
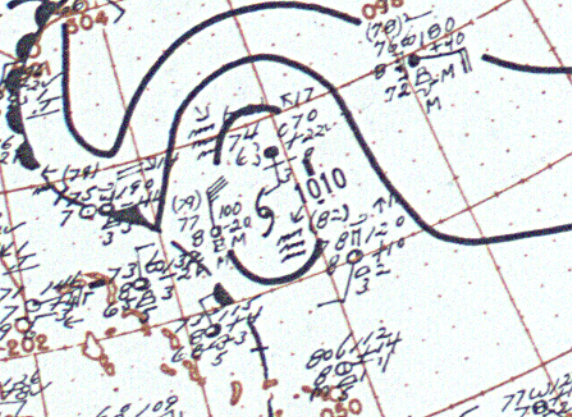
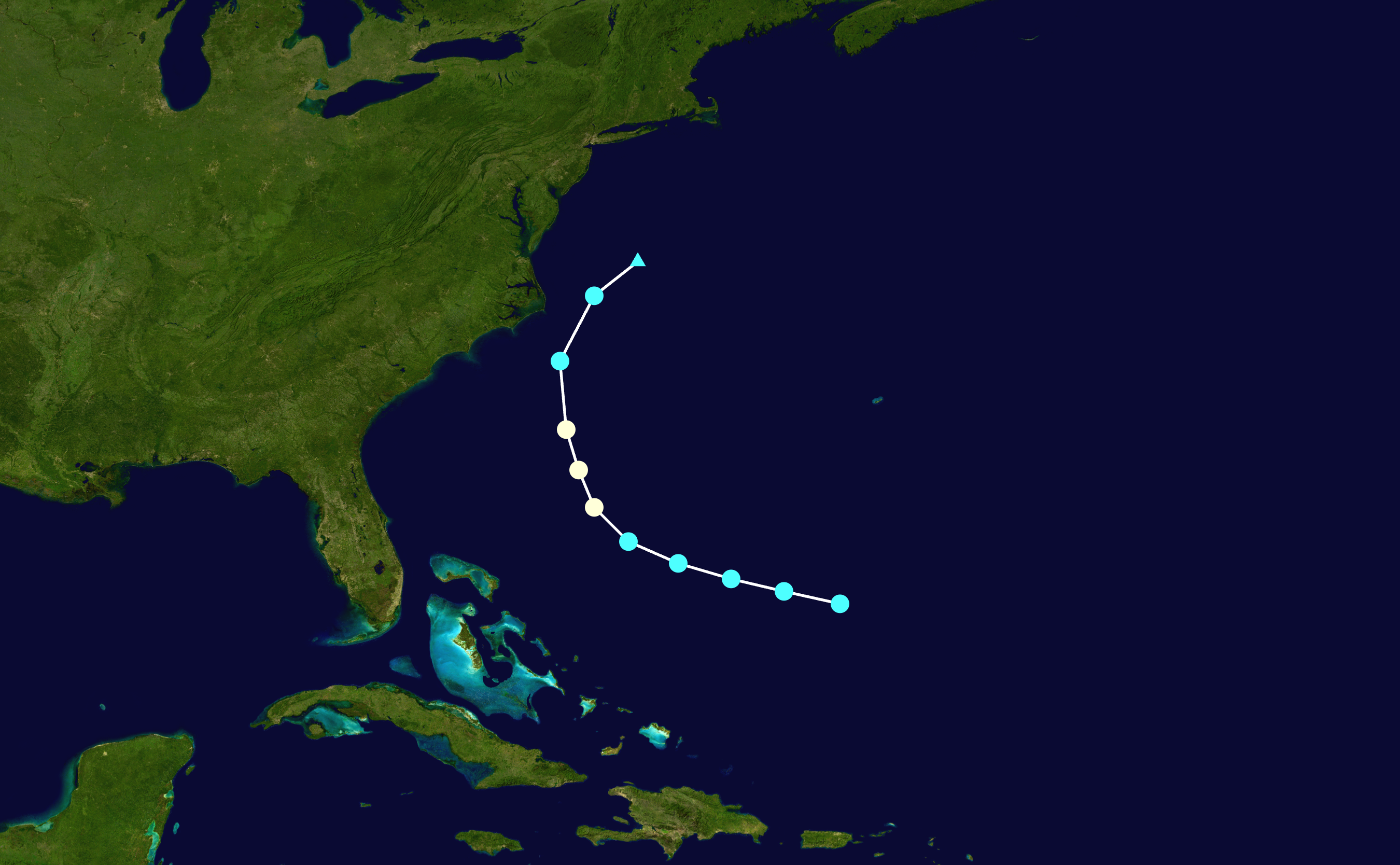
- Duration: November 8 – November 11
- Peak intensity: 75 mph (120 km/h) (1-min); 990 mbar (hPa)

A tropical storm developed about midway between Bermuda and Puerto Rico on November 8. Designated as George by the Air Weather Service in real time, the storm moved quickly west-northwestward. Early on November 10, George is believed to have reached hurricane intensity after reconnaissance aircraft flights recorded a small area of winds ranging from 70 to 80 mph (110 to 130 km/h). Peaking as a Category 1 hurricane with maximum sustained winds of 75 mph (121 km/h) and a minimum barometric pressure of 990 mbar (29 inHg), George then curved north-northwestward. Later that day, the hurricane began to become disorganized and weakened to a tropical storm. Early on November 11, George degenerated into an area of disturbed weather while located about 195 mi (314 km) east of Virginia Beach, Virginia. As the hurricane threatened the coast of North Carolina on November 10, hurricane warnings were issued between Cape Lookout and Cape Hatteras.

=== Other systems ===
In addition to the ten systems that became a tropical storm there five other tropical cyclones that failed to strengthen beyond tropical depression strength.

A weak broad low pressure area formerly associated with a trough developed into a tropical depression well northeast of the Lesser Antilles on April 15. A barometric pressure of 1,005 mbar (29.7 inHg) was observed that day. The depression moved northward and then became stationary by April 17, before degenerating into a trough on the next day.

The next tropical depression developed from a northward moving tropical wave over the eastern Gulf of Mexico on July 31. Although the depression continued northward, it cannot be determined if the system made landfall in the Florida panhandle before dissipating on August 2. Tampa recorded a 5-minute sustained wind speed of 34 mph (55 km/h) on July 31.

On August 13, another tropical depression formed from area of disturbed weather well offshore the Mid-Atlantic. The system moved rapidly northeastward and became extratropical early on August 14. It may have been a tropical storm, based on barometric pressure of 995 mbar (29.4 inHg) observed by a ship shortly after extratropical transition.

On September 16, a trough of low pressure developed into a tropical depression over the western Gulf of Mexico. Unfavorable conditions caused the depression to dissipated by the following day.

On September 25, a westward moving tropical wave near the Lesser Antilles began appearing in historical weather map. A reconnaissance aircraft flight into the system when it was over the central Caribbean Sea indicated wind gusts up to 52 mph (84 km/h), but no circulation. During a separate fight on September 29, it was noted that, "[a] complete search of area shows well-organized circle of storm but open to west and northwest". Although no circulation was detected, westerly winds were reported, making it likely that a tropical depression developed that day over the western Caribbean. Subsequently, the depression moved over the northern Yucatán Peninsula, which may have disrupted the poorly defined circulation. By October 1, the system entered the Gulf of Mexico, where it began degenerating into an open trough on October 3. Cold air and the development of Hurricane Fox in the western Caribbean prevented re-generation. The remnant low continued northeastward into North Florida and deepened while producing strong gales along the coasts of North Carolina and Virginia. It may have lingered until October 8, before being absorbed by Fox.

== Season effects ==
This is a table of all of the tropical cyclones that formed in the 1948 Atlantic hurricane season. It includes their name, duration, peak classification and intensities, areas affected, damage, and death totals. Deaths in parentheses are additional and indirect (an example of an indirect death would be a traffic accident), but were still related to that storm. Damage and deaths include totals while the storm was extratropical, a wave, or a low, and all of the damage figures are in 1948 USD.

Saffir–Simpson scale
TD	TS	C1	C2	C3	C4	C5

1948 North Atlantic tropical cyclone season statistics
Storm name	Dates active	Storm category at peak intensity	Max 1-min wind mph (km/h)	Min. press. (mbar)	Areas affected	Damage (US$)	Deaths	Ref(s).
Depression	April 15–17	Tropical depression	Unknown	1005	None	None	None	
One	May 22–28	Tropical storm	50 (85)	1004	Hispaniola, Bermuda	Unknown	80	
Two	July 7–11	Tropical storm	40 (65)	1007	Southeastern United States	Minimal	None	
Depression	July 31 – August 2	Tropical depression	Unknown	Unknown	Florida	Minimal	None	
Depression	August 13–14	Tropical depression	30 (45)	1003	None	None	None	
Three (Able)	August 26 – September 4	Category 3 hurricane	120 (195)	983	Atlantic Canada	≥$990,000	None	
Four (Baker)	August 31 – September 1	Tropical storm	60 (95)	1009	Lesser Antilles	Minimal	None	
Five (Charlie)	September 1–7	Category 1 hurricane	80 (130)	989	Southeastern United States, Midwestern United States	$900,000	None	
Six (Dog)	September 4–15	Category 4 hurricane	130 (215)	≥940	Bermuda, Atlantic Canada	$400,000	8	
Seven	September 7–10	Tropical storm	65 (100)	993	None	Unknown	None	
Depression	September 16–17	Tropical depression	Unknown	Unknown	None	None	None	
Eight (Easy)	September 18–25	Category 4 hurricane	130 (215)	≥940	Cayman Islands, Cuba, Florida, Bermuda	$14 million	13	
Depression	September 29 – October 2	Tropical depression	35 (55)	1004	None	None	None	
Nine (Fox)	October 3–16	Category 3 hurricane	120 (195)	975	Cuba, Florida, Bermuda	$12.5 million	11	
Ten (George)	November 8–11	Category 1 hurricane	80 (130)	990	None affected	None	None	
Season aggregates
15 systems	April 15 – November 11		130 (215)	≥940		$28.79 million	112	

== See also ==
- 1948 Pacific hurricane season
- 1948 Pacific typhoon season
- 1900–1950 South-West Indian Ocean cyclone seasons
- 1940s Australian region cyclone seasons
- 1940s South Pacific cyclone seasons
