= 1928 Haiti hurricane =

Category 1 Atlantic hurricane in 1928

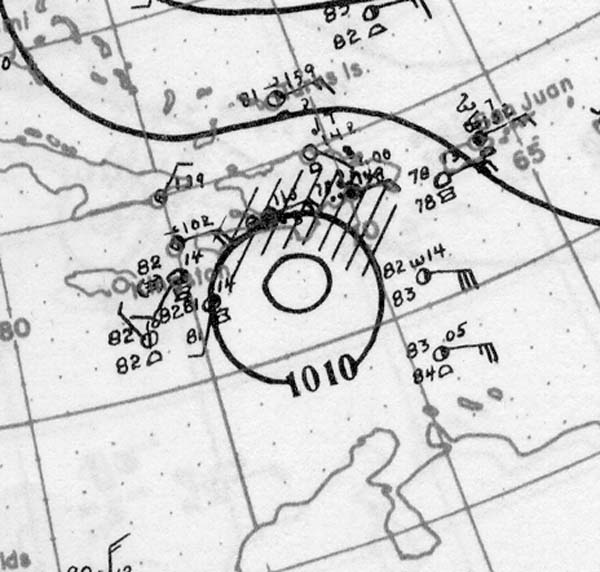
- Surface weather analysis of the storm on August 10

Meteorological history
- Formed: August 7, 1928
- Dissipated: August 17, 1928

Category 1 hurricane
- 1-minute sustained (SSHWS/NWS)
- Highest winds: 90 mph (150 km/h)
- Lowest pressure: 998 mbar (hPa); 29.47 inHg

Overall effects
- Fatalities: At least 210
- Damage: $2 million (1928 USD)
- Areas affected: Haiti, Cuba, Southeastern United States
- IBTrACS
- Part of the 1928 Atlantic hurricane season

The 1928 Haiti hurricane was considered the worst tropical cyclone in Haiti since the 1886 Indianola hurricane. The second tropical cyclone and second hurricane of the season, the storm developed from a tropical wave near Tobago on August 7. Steadily intensifying as it moved northwestward, the system passed through the southern Windward Islands. Upon entering the Caribbean Sea early on August 8, the tropical depression strengthened into a tropical storm. On August 9, the storm strengthened to the equivalent of a Category 1 hurricane. The next day, the hurricane peaked with winds of 90 mph (140 km/h). After striking the Tiburon Peninsula of Haiti, the cyclone began weakening and fell to tropical storm intensity on August 12. By midday on the following day, the storm made landfall near Cienfuegos, Cuba. Upon emerging into the Straits of Florida, the storm began to re-strengthen. Early on August 13, it struck Big Pine Key, Florida, as a strong tropical storm. Weakening slowly while moving north-northwestward, the system made another landfall near St. George Island. After moving inland, the tropical storm slowly deteriorated and dissipated over West Virginia on August 17.

In Haiti, the storm completely wiped out livestock and many crops, particularly coffee, cocoa, and sugar. Several villages were also destroyed, rendering approximately 10,000 people homeless. Damage reached $1 million and there were at least 200 deaths. (Note: All damage totals are in 1928 United States dollars unless otherwise noted.) The only impact in Cuba was downed banana trees. In Florida, the storm left minor wind damage along the coast. A Seaboard Air Line Railroad station was destroyed in Boca Grande, while signs, trees, and telephone poles were knocked down in Sarasota. Several streets in St. Petersburg were closed due to flooding or debris. Between Cedar Key and the Florida Panhandle, several vessels capsized. Water washed up along the side of roads and in wooded areas. The storm contributed to flooding onset by the previous hurricane, with rainfall peaking at 13.5 in (340 mm) in Caesars Head, South Carolina. The worst impact from flooding occurred in North Carolina, where several houses were destroyed. Six people were killed in the state, of which four due to flooding. Property damage in the state totaled over $1 million. Overall, the storm caused at least $2 million in damage and 210 fatalities.

== Meteorological history ==
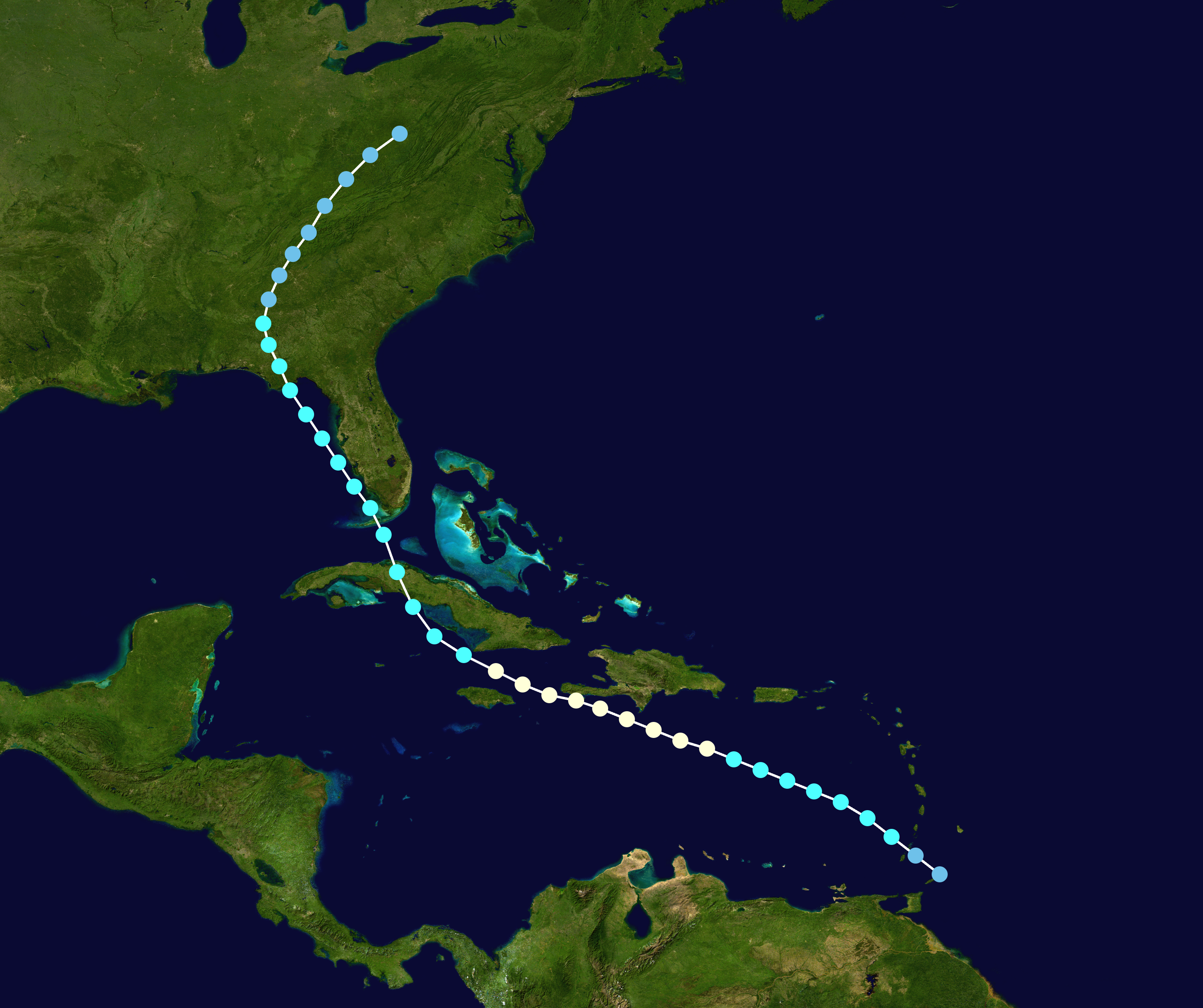
Map plotting the storm's track and intensity, according to the Saffir–Simpson scale Map key Saffir–Simpson scale Tropical depression (≤38 mph, ≤62 km/h) Tropical storm (39–73 mph, 63–118 km/h) Category 1 (74–95 mph, 119–153 km/h) Category 2 (96–110 mph, 154–177 km/h) Category 3 (111–129 mph, 178–208 km/h) Category 4 (130–156 mph, 209–251 km/h) Category 5 (≥157 mph, ≥252 km/h) Unknown Storm type Tropical cyclone Subtropical cyclone Extratropical cyclone, remnant low, tropical disturbance, or monsoon depression

A westward-moving tropical wave developed into a tropical depression while situated near Tobago on August 7. Initially, the storm was considered a "disturbance of slight to moderate intensity". Moving northwestward, the system passed through the Windward Islands just south of Carriacou and Petite Martinique. Upon entering the Caribbean Sea early on August 8, a ship reported winds of 46 mph (74 km/h). As a result, HURDAT indicates that the depression became a tropical storm at 00:00 UTC. On August 9, the storm strengthened into a Category 1 hurricane on the modern-day Saffir–Simpson hurricane wind scale, while located about 155 mi (249 km) south of San Pedro de Macorís, Dominican Republic. At 12:00 UTC on August 10, the cyclone attained its peak intensity as strong Category 1 hurricane with maximum sustained winds with winds of 90 mph (140 km/h) and a minimum barometric pressure of 998 mbar (29.5 inHg). Early on August 9, the storm made landfall in the Tiburon Peninsula of Haiti, based on "belated reports [indicating] that a very small but destructive disturbance passed over extreme southwest Haiti". The quickly re-emerged into the Caribbean Sea later that day.

A small cyclone, the hurricane passed between Cuba and Jamaica and weakened to a tropical storm early on August 12. By midday, the storm made landfall near Cienfuegos, Cuba, with winds of 60 mph (97 km/h). Several telegraphic reports indicated that "the center [of the storm] was not definitely traceable for the next 24 to 36 hours", but other reports noted that the center passed over then-Oriente Province. Hours later, the system reached the Straits of Florida and immediately began to re-intensify. Early on August 13, it struck Big Pine Key, Florida, as a strong tropical storm with winds of 70 mph (110 km/h). Thereafter, the storm moved north-northwestward over the Gulf of Mexico. At 14:00 UTC on August 14, it made landfall near St. George Island, Florida, with winds of 50 mph (80 km/h). After moving inland, the tropical storm slowly deteriorated, falling to tropical depression intensity over east-central Alabama on August 15. Thereafter, the depression moved north-northeastward and dissipated over West Virginia on August 17.

== Impact ==
=== Greater Antilles ===
As the storm approached Hispaniola, warnings were sent to vessels offshore Haiti and Jamaica. In Haiti, the storm brought torrential rainfall for over 20 hours. Many villages were completely destroyed, leaving over 10,000 people homeless. The city of Saint-Louis-du-Sud was almost completely wiped out, with only two buildings retaining their roofs. Additionally, approximately 80% of buildings in Grand-Boucan and Petit Trou were flattened. Overall, most municipalities were flooded with 8 to 20 ft (2.4 to 6.1 m) of water. At least 200 deaths were recorded, including 26 in Miragoâne and 12 at a single dwellings in Belle-Riviere. In the most devastated areas, flooding also killed all farm animals and entire coffee, cocoa, and sugar crops were wiped out. An estimated three to six months was required to regrow the lost agriculture. Along the coast, rough seas capsized or washed ashore many small crafts. The storm was described as the worst in Haiti since the 1886 Indianola hurricane. The storm destroyed most of the unpaved, vehicular trails in its path. Overall, the damage to roadways, communications, and public services was estimated at $1 million.

After the storm, approximately 100,000 people were facing starvation. Then-Haitian president Louis Borno reported that the government had inefficient resources for recovery and asked citizens to assist with repairing infrastructure and providing food and shelter to others. The Government of Haiti, in turn, appropriated $200,000 for relief. Eleven storages with relief supplies were established throughout the country. The approximately 10,000 people left homeless were temporarily houses in larger, undamaged buildings. Within a few months after the storm, 299 homes were rebuilt or repaired, costing almost $37,000. The vehicular paths destroyed by the hurricane were eventually replaced by 10 ft (3.0 m)-wide paved gravel roads. In September, the American Red Cross donated $10,000 to the Haitian Red Cross.

In Cuba, the storm brought gusty winds and excessive rainfall, but impact was primarily limited to fallen banana trees in an area then known as Oriente Province.

=== United States ===
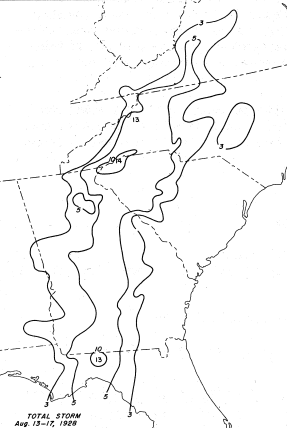
Rainfall totals associated with the hurricane in the United States

Hurricane warnings were hoisted in portions of the Florida Keys early on August 13. However, the highest observed wind speed was only 36 mph (58 km/h). Between Cedar Key and the Florida Panhandle, some residents took refuge at churches and schools. In the mainland of Florida, winds resulted in generally minor damage along the west coast. In Boca Grande, a Seaboard Air Line Railroad station was destroyed. Plate glass was damaged and signs, trees, and telephone poles were knocked down in Sarasota. Rough seas began smashing a revenue cutter service ship docked at the Coast Guard station in St. Petersburg against the wharves; bumpers were placed between the ship and pilings to further damage. Several streets were closed due to flooding or debris. One street closed after roof tiles started falling from a theater. At one intersection, several cars were stranded due to 3 ft (0.91 m) of water covering the road. Although some coastal areas experienced rough seas, others reported their lowest tides in years, especially Pass-a-Grille and Tampa, with almost all of the water blown out of Boca Ciega Bay, which is located adjacent to the former. Several vessels, mostly small fishing crafts, capsized. Water washed up along the side of roads and in wooded areas, while many trees were toppled.

The storm also contributed to ongoing flooding in the Southeastern United States onset by the previous hurricane. In Georgia, hydroelectric dams in Quitman were overtopped by creeks and rivers. One highway was completely submerged and four bridges were swept away. A railroad passenger train was abandoned due to water rising above the tracks. The Ocmulgee River at Macon crested at 20.9 ft (6.4 m). Additionally, the Withlacoochee River was expect to reach its highest level in years. Overall, crops, highways, and railroads across the southern portion of the state were severely damaged. Milledgeville was left without water due to flooding. The Oconee River was expected to reach 34 ft (10 m) in height at the city's river gauge. A bridge across the Oconee was swept away as was approximately 1,500 ft (460 m) of railroad tracks. About 200 families in Augusta evacuated due to the rising Savannah River. In South Carolina, rainfall peaked at 13.5 in (340 mm) in Caesars Head, which is the highest precipitation total associated with the storm. The city of Spartanburg prepared for its worst flood since 1916. Throughout Upstate South Carolina, highways, railroads, and crops were flooded. In Bath, a "freakish" tornado destroyed at least 50 homes and injured one person. Additionally, a wind storm in Newberry County severely damaged "scores" of dwellings. Two deaths occurred in South Carolina.

In North Carolina, rainfall caused the Catawba, French Broad, Swannanoa, and Yadkin rivers to overflow their banks. Many nearby homes and structures were swept away. Families along the South Pacolet River near Tryon were evacuated. Additionally, two shelters were set up in Asheville, one at a Salvation Army post and another at the municipal auditorium, where hundreds of cots were set up. A mudslide near Asheville moved across a railroad track, blocking the route to locomotive traffic. Several feet of water covered highways near Marshall, leaving many roads impassable. Extensive crop losses also occurred in western North Carolina, with agricultural losses reaching $250,000 in Burke County alone. Six people were killed in the state, of which four due to flooding and two others from a tornado in Ashley Heights. Property damage totaled over $1 million. Rainfall from both the previous hurricane and this storm brought flooding to Virginia. Major flooding was reported along the Roanoke River from Brookneal to Roanoke. At the former, the river crested at 14 ft (4.3 m) above flood stage. In Altavista, crops were ruined and 11 buildings were flooded. Route 17 north of Fincastle was inundated, blocking traffic between Clifton Forge and Covington. Two deaths occurred in Virginia, one from drowning and another from fright while crossing the Roanoke River.

== See also ==
- Hurricane Ernesto (2006)
- Tropical Storm Alberto (1994)
- Tropical Storm Andrea (2013)
- Tropical Storm Erika
