= Raven Cliff Falls =

Raven Cliff Falls may refer to:

- Raven Cliff Falls (Georgia), White County, Georgia, United States
- Raven Cliff Falls (South Carolina), Greenville County, South Carolina, United States
