= Caesars Head, South Carolina =

- Census-designated place
- Location within South Carolina Location within the United States
- Coordinates: 35°06′22″N 82°37′30″W
- Country: United States
- State: South Carolina
- County: Greenville

Area
  - Total: 1.47 sq mi (3.81 km^{2})
  - Land: 1.47 sq mi (3.81 km^{2})
  - Water: 0 sq mi (0.00 km^{2})
- Elevation: 3,005 ft (916 m)

Population (2020)
  - Total: 84
  - Density: 57.1/sq mi (22.05/km^{2})
- Time zone: UTC-5 (Eastern (EST))
  - Summer (DST): UTC-4 (EDT)
- ZIP Code: 29635 (Cleveland)
- Area codes: 864, 821
- FIPS code: 45-10585
- GNIS feature ID: 2812959

Caesars Head is an unincorporated community and census-designated place (CDP) on top of Caesars Head, a mountain in Greenville County, South Carolina, United States. It was first listed as a CDP in the 2020 census with a population of 84.

The CDP is in northwestern Greenville County along U.S. Route 276, 2 miles (3 km) south of the North Carolina border. The 3,208-foot (978 m) summit of Caesars Head is in the western part of the CDP, and most of the residential development is in the northeastern part, at elevations ranging from 2,800 to 3,200 feet (850 to 980 m) above sea level. The remainder of the CDP is within Caesars Head State Park.

US 276 (Geer Highway) leads north 15 miles (24 km) to Brevard, North Carolina, and southeast 31 miles (50 km) to Greenville.

== Demographics ==
Historical population
Census	Pop.	Note	%±
2020	84		—
U.S. Decennial Census; 2020

Caesars Head first appeared as a census designated place in the 2020 U.S. census.

=== 2020 census ===
Buford CDP, South Carolina – Demographic Profile (NH = Non-Hispanic)
Race / Ethnicity	Pop 2020	% 2020
White alone (NH)	77	91.67%
Black or African American alone (NH)	0	0.00%
Native American or Alaska Native alone (NH)	0	0.00%
Asian alone (NH)	2	2.38%
Pacific Islander alone (NH)	0	0.00%
Some Other Race alone (NH)	1	1.19%
Mixed Race/Multi-Racial (NH)	1	1.19%
Hispanic or Latino (any race)	3	3.57%
Total	84	100.00%

Note: the US Census treats Hispanic/Latino as an ethnic category. This table excludes Latinos from the racial categories and assigns them to a separate category. Hispanics/Latinos can be of any race.

== Climate ==
According to the Köppen Climate Classification system, Caesar's Head has a humid subtropical climate, abbreviated "Cfa" on climate maps. The hottest temperature recorded in Caesar's Head was 99 °F (37.2 °C) on July 29, 1952 and August 21, 1983, while the coldest temperature recorded was −19 °F (−28.3 °C) on January 21, 1985, which is the coldest temperature ever recorded in South Carolina.

Climate data for Caesar's Head, South Carolina, 1991–2020 normals, extremes 1925–present
Month	Jan	Feb	Mar	Apr	May	Jun	Jul	Aug	Sep	Oct	Nov	Dec	Year
Record high °F (°C)	73 (23)	73 (23)	85 (29)	90 (32)	98 (37)	97 (36)	99 (37)	99 (37)	98 (37)	89 (32)	79 (26)	75 (24)	99 (37)
Mean maximum °F (°C)	62.0 (16.7)	64.2 (17.9)	74.3 (23.5)	79.1 (26.2)	81.2 (27.3)	84.3 (29.1)	84.8 (29.3)	83.5 (28.6)	80.3 (26.8)	75.2 (24.0)	69.3 (20.7)	62.0 (16.7)	87.0 (30.6)
Mean daily maximum °F (°C)	44.8 (7.1)	48.3 (9.1)	55.9 (13.3)	65.0 (18.3)	70.0 (21.1)	75.0 (23.9)	77.6 (25.3)	76.2 (24.6)	71.1 (21.7)	62.9 (17.2)	54.9 (12.7)	47.6 (8.7)	62.4 (16.9)
Daily mean °F (°C)	36.3 (2.4)	39.3 (4.1)	46.3 (7.9)	54.7 (12.6)	61.6 (16.4)	67.7 (19.8)	70.7 (21.5)	69.4 (20.8)	64.3 (17.9)	55.3 (12.9)	46.6 (8.1)	39.9 (4.4)	54.3 (12.4)
Mean daily minimum °F (°C)	27.9 (−2.3)	30.3 (−0.9)	36.6 (2.6)	44.4 (6.9)	53.2 (11.8)	60.4 (15.8)	63.9 (17.7)	62.6 (17.0)	57.6 (14.2)	47.8 (8.8)	38.2 (3.4)	32.1 (0.1)	46.3 (7.9)
Mean minimum °F (°C)	8.3 (−13.2)	12.5 (−10.8)	18.1 (−7.7)	28.3 (−2.1)	39.5 (4.2)	50.9 (10.5)	57.5 (14.2)	55.9 (13.3)	46.3 (7.9)	33.4 (0.8)	22.6 (−5.2)	17.2 (−8.2)	5.3 (−14.8)
Record low °F (°C)	−19 (−28)	−6 (−21)	1 (−17)	17 (−8)	30 (−1)	38 (3)	44 (7)	45 (7)	28 (−2)	23 (−5)	−1 (−18)	−5 (−21)	−19 (−28)
Average precipitation inches (mm)	6.02 (153)	4.82 (122)	5.17 (131)	5.93 (151)	6.11 (155)	6.93 (176)	7.02 (178)	6.97 (177)	6.62 (168)	5.60 (142)	5.93 (151)	7.08 (180)	74.2 (1,884)
Average snowfall inches (cm)	2.7 (6.9)	1.6 (4.1)	0.3 (0.76)	0.0 (0.0)	0.1 (0.25)	0.0 (0.0)	0.0 (0.0)	0.0 (0.0)	0.0 (0.0)	0.0 (0.0)	0.0 (0.0)	2.6 (6.6)	7.3 (18.61)
Average precipitation days (≥ 0.01 in)	9.4	9.8	11.0	10.5	11.2	14.1	16.9	15.3	9.7	8.2	9.6	10.0	135.7
Average snowy days (≥ 0.1 in)	0.7	0.9	0.4	0.0	0.0	0.0	0.0	0.0	0.0	0.0	0.0	0.6	2.6
Source: NOAA
