= Caesars Head State Park =

State park in South Carolina

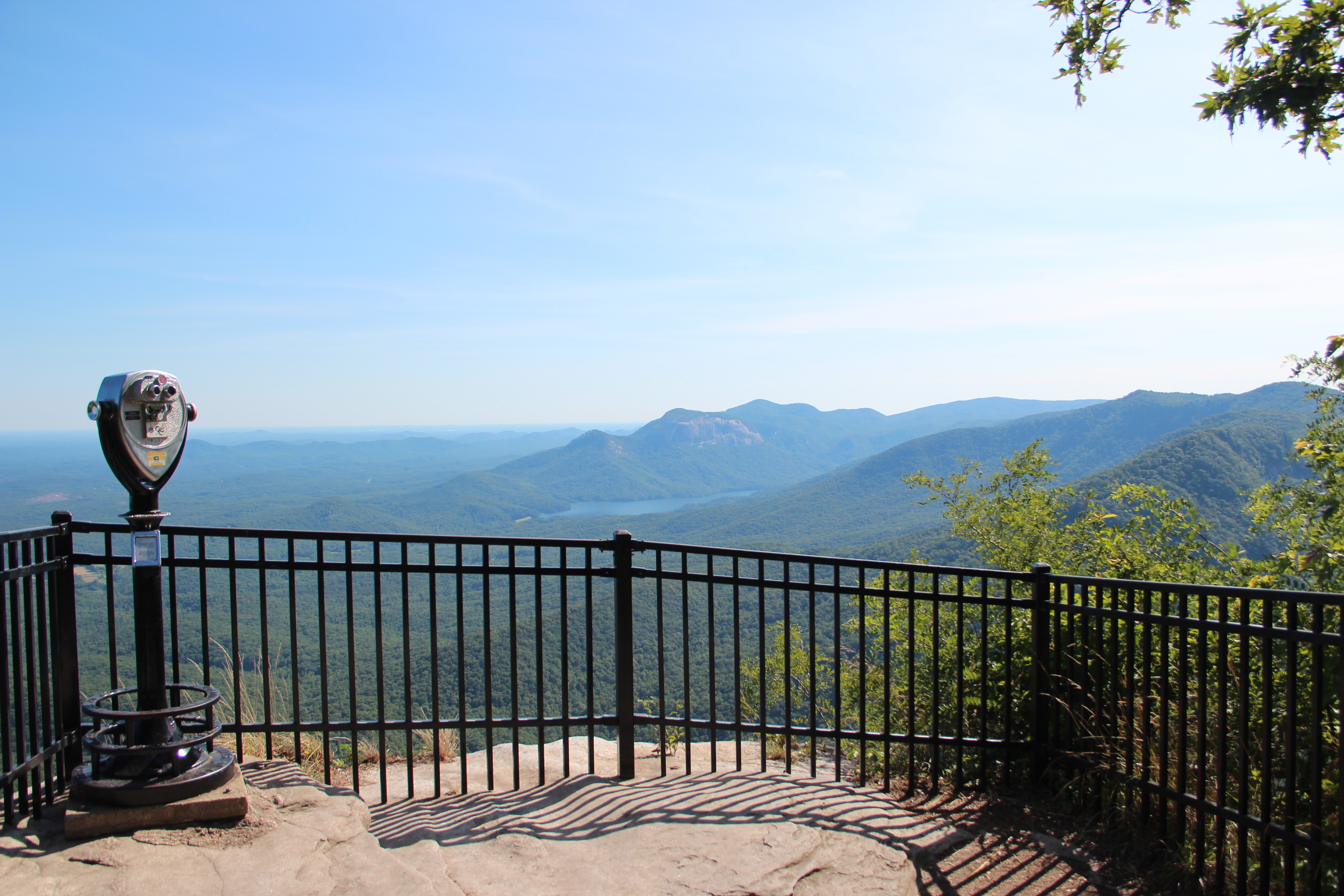
- Overlook at Caesars Head State Park

- Location within South Carolina
- Nearest city: Cleveland, SC
- Coordinates: 35°7′N 82°36′W
- Area: 7,467 acres (30.2 km^{2})
- Created: from 1976 to 1986
- Camp sites: 24 primitive trailside sites
- Hiking trails: 13
- Website: Park website

Caesars Head State Park is a park in northern Greenville County, South Carolina, that borders Transylvania County, North Carolina, and is reached via US 276. The eponymous rock formation, one of the highest points in Greenville County, is a granitic gneiss outcrop at 3,208 ft (978 m) above sea level on the Blue Ridge Escarpment of the Blue Ridge Mountains and rests roughly 2,000 ft (600 m) above the Piedmont below. The origin of the name "Caesars Head" is disputed, though the outcrop was most probably named for an early mountaineer's dog. Caesars Head State Park and Jones Gap State Park are jointly administered by the state Department of Parks, Recreation, and Tourism as part of the Mountain Bridge Wilderness.

== History ==
In 1825 the state engineer and noted architect Robert Mills described Caesars Head as a "mass of granite, rising from the vale, through which a rapid river winds its turbulent way...the ledges of stone, rising almost perpendicular, and at length, hanging over at [the] top, so that they seem to totter to their fall."

After the completion of the Jones Gap Road in 1848, a former state senator, Benjamin Hagood, purchased about 2,400 acres (970 ha) around Caesars Head where he built a summer cottage, and later a hotel, "to take advantage of the area's cool breezes, moderate temperatures, and breath-taking views." The hotel closed in 1862, and Hagood died in 1865, leaving the property to his daughter Eliza and her husband, Dr. Francis Miles, the first physician in Pickens County. During the Civil War, the area was frequented by deserters from the Confederate Army, but by 1876 the Mileses were operating a health resort on the mountain.

In 1880, Miles sold the hotel to E. M. Seabrook of Charleston, who enlarged the inn and associated cottages but was unable to pay off the mortgage. In 1885, the property reverted to Miles, who was said to have been "a model innkeeper" of a "comfortable primitive hotel". In 1897, the Mileses deeded the property to Furman University in exchange for an annuity and free room and board for the rest of their lives. In 1924, Furman sold the property to a development company interested in selling lots for summer homes. The hotel continued to operate even when the land developer failed during the Depression. In 1946 brothers Pete and Tom Marchant bought the property and added tennis courts and a swimming pool. The hotel, a cottage, and the adjacent servants' quarters—the original Hagood house—burned in the early morning of September 9, 1954. The Department of Parks, Recreation, and Tourism acquired the park lands from various owners between 1976 and 1986.

== Recreation ==
The park is noted for its panoramic view of the mountain country and is a destination for hiking, trailside camping, and picnicking. A popular hiking trail in the park leads to the 420-foot-high (128 m) Raven Cliff Falls, crossed by a suspension bridge. There are five other waterfalls in the park.

The park permits fishing with artificial lures for brook, rainbow, and brown trout in the Middle Saluda River and Julian and Matthews creeks. Each autumn, the park becomes a seasonal home for thousands of migrating hawks. Other wildlife includes black bear, peregrine falcon, and the federally endangered green salamander.

The visitor center at the park headquarters off US 276 includes an interpretive museum that features photographs of the park's human history as well as a relief map of the entire Mountain Bridge Wilderness Area.
