= 1928 Fort Pierce hurricane =

Category 2 Atlantic hurricane in 1928

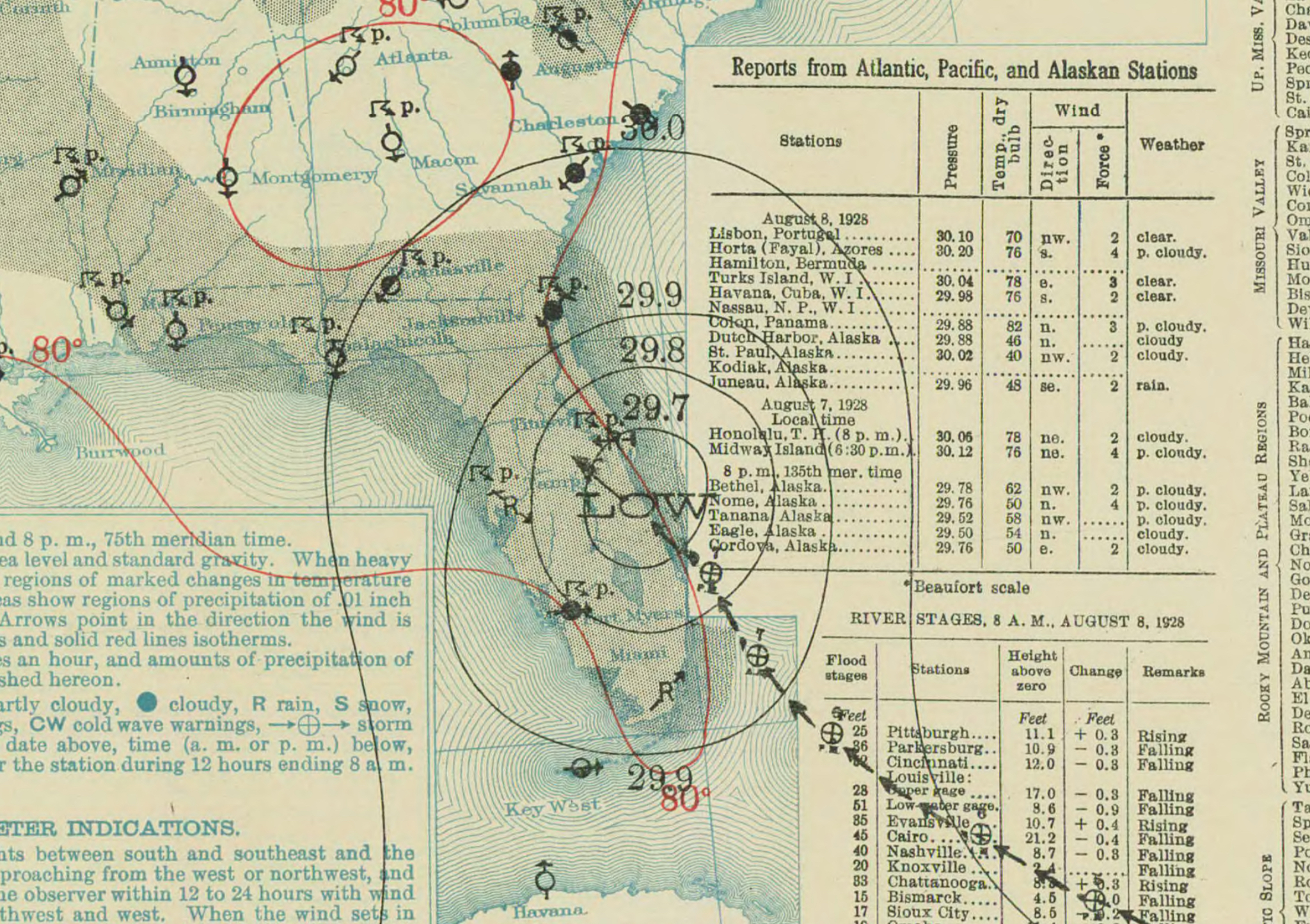
- Surface weather analysis of the hurricane shortly before landfall on August 8

Meteorological history
- Formed: August 3, 1928
- Extratropical: August 11, 1928
- Dissipated: August 14, 1928

Category 2 hurricane
- 1-minute sustained (SSHWS/NWS)
- Highest winds: 105 mph (165 km/h)
- Lowest pressure: 971 mbar (hPa); 28.67 inHg

Overall effects
- Fatalities: 2
- Damage: $235,000 (1982 USD)
- Areas affected: The Bahamas, Cuba, Southeastern United States
- IBTrACS
- Part of the 1928 Atlantic hurricane season

The 1928 Fort Pierce hurricane devastated areas of Florida and the Southeastern United States in August 1928. The first tropical cyclone and hurricane of the annual hurricane season, the storm developed from a tropical wave first identified on August 3, 1928, north of the Virgin Islands. Slowly intensifying as it moved west-northwest, the system paralleled the Greater Antilles throughout much of its early existence. On August 5, the tropical storm strengthened to the equivalent of a Category 1 hurricane, while positioned over The Bahamas. The hurricane continued to intensify, and after reaching Category 2 hurricane strength, attained its peak intensity on August 7 with winds of 105 mph (169 km/h) and a minimum barometric pressure of 971 mbar (971 hPa; 28.7 inHg). Shortly after, the hurricane made landfall as a slightly weaker storm just southeast of Fort Pierce, Florida at 0700 UTC on August 8. Weakening as it moved across the Florida peninsula over the course of the next day, the storm briefly moved over the Gulf of Mexico before recurving northwards. Thus, it made a second landfall on the Florida Panhandle on August 10 as a tropical storm. Once inland, the system continued to weaken, degenerating to tropical depression strength before transitioning into an extratropical storm later that day. The extratropical remnants progressed outwards into the Atlantic Ocean before entirely dissipating by August 14.

In its early developmental stages north of the Greater Antilles, the storm caused minor damage to shipping in The Bahamas and generated rough seas offshore Cuba. At its first landfall on Fort Pierce, the hurricane caused extensive property damage, particularly in coastal regions, where numerous homes were unroofed. Central Florida's citrus crop was hampered by the strong winds and heavy rain. Several of Florida's lakes, including Lake Okeechobee, rose past their banks, inundating coastal areas. Damage to infrastructure was less in inland regions than at the coast, though power outages caused loss of communication statewide. At the hurricane's second landfall, wind damage was relatively minor, though torrential rainfall, aided by orthographic lift, caused extensive flooding as far north as the Mid-Atlantic states. Overall, the hurricane caused $235,000 in damages, primarily in Florida, (Note: All damage totals are in 1928 United States dollars unless otherwise noted.) and two deaths.

== Meteorological history ==
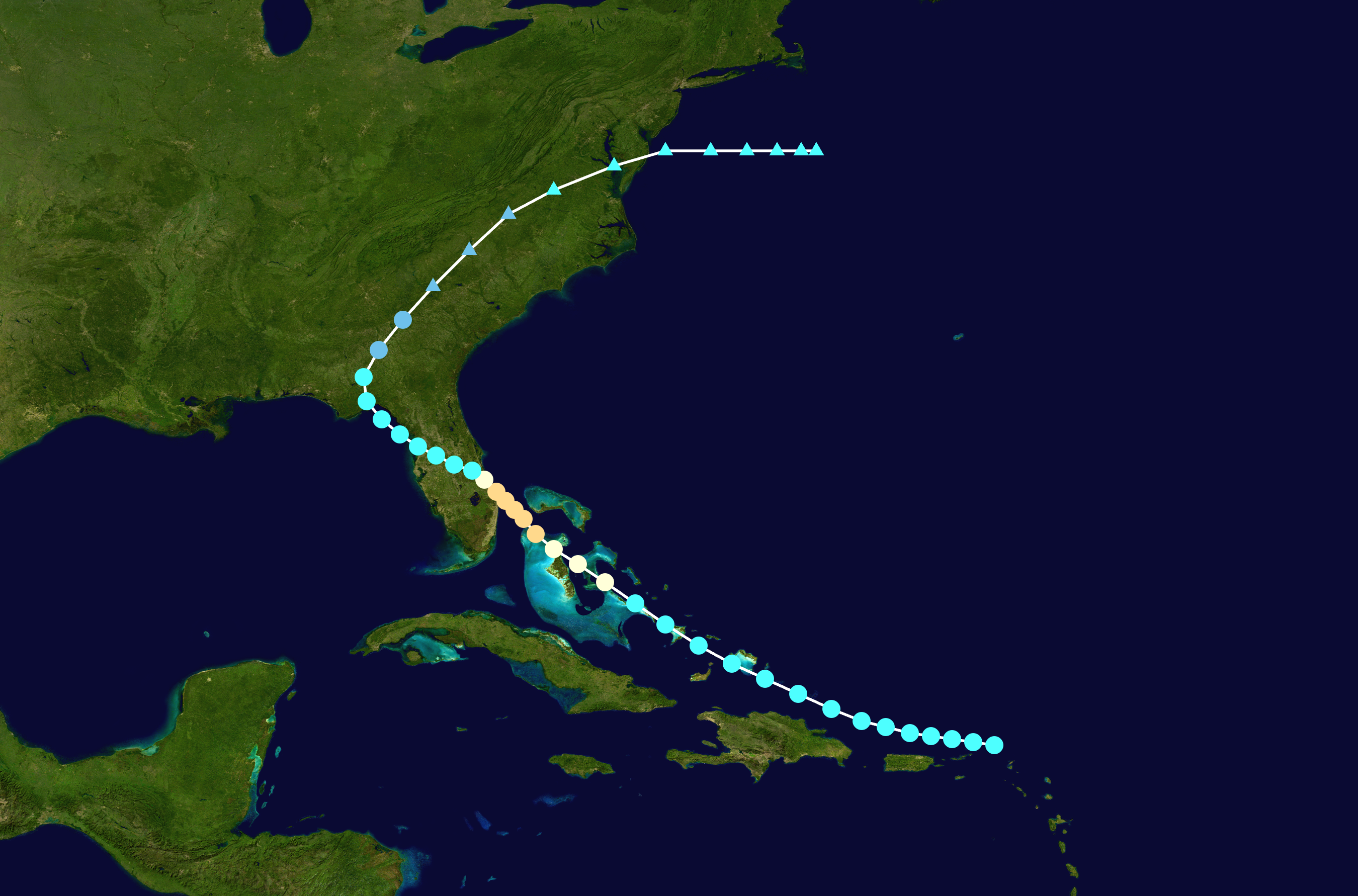
Map plotting the storm's track and intensity, according to the Saffir–Simpson scale Map key Saffir–Simpson scale Tropical depression (≤38 mph, ≤62 km/h) Tropical storm (39–73 mph, 63–118 km/h) Category 1 (74–95 mph, 119–153 km/h) Category 2 (96–110 mph, 154–177 km/h) Category 3 (111–129 mph, 178–208 km/h) Category 4 (130–156 mph, 209–251 km/h) Category 5 (≥157 mph, ≥252 km/h) Unknown Storm type Tropical cyclone Subtropical cyclone Extratropical cyclone, remnant low, tropical disturbance, or monsoon depression

A tropical disturbance was first identified north of the Leeward Islands near the Virgin Islands at 0000 UTC on August 3. Due to a lack of conclusive weather reports from nearby areas at the time, the origins of the tropical storm were initially unknown, but listed the system as forming near Trinidad and Barbados in the HURDAT—the database listing all tropical cyclones in the Atlantic basin since 1851. However, the Atlantic hurricane reanalysis project analyzed the storm to have formed north of the Leeward Islands based on reports from San Juan, Puerto Rico, and as such revised the storm's HURDAT listing. Moving to the west-northwest, the tropical storm maintained its intensity without any intensification early in its existence. Ships in the region reported tropical storm-force winds and low barometric pressures. The ship S.S. Sixaola sent a telegraphic report of the storm's location and existence west of Acklins Island on August 5, the first ship to explicitly do so. Beginning to accelerate as it paralleled the Cuban Atlantic coast the following day, the storm intensified to reach an intensity equivalent to a modern-day Category 1 hurricane at 1200 UTC.

The hurricane continued to intensify, and attained Category 2 hurricane intensity by 0600 UTC on August 7. At around the same time, the S.S. Lempira reported a minimum pressure of 971 mbar (971 hPa; 28.7 inHg), while 30 miles (48 km) southeast of Jupiter, Florida. At the time, maximum sustained winds were estimated at 105 mph (169 km/h); this would be the hurricane's peak intensity. The hurricane weakened slightly before making landfall on central Florida, just southeast of Fort Pierce, Florida, at 0700 UTC the following day. Winds at landfall were estimated at 100 mph (160 km/h), with a minimum central pressure of 977 mbar (28.9 inHg) recorded in Fort Pierce within the hurricane's eye. At the time, the system's maximum winds extended up to 10 mi (16 km) from the center of circulation. The storm then slowly crossed the Florida peninsula, before entering the Gulf of Mexico the next day near Tampa, Florida, after having weakened down to tropical storm strength. Despite remaining over water, its close proximity to the continent prevented further strengthening. The tropical storm recurved to the north in the gulf, before making a second landfall near Apalachicola, Florida at 0400 UTC on August 10 with winds of 40 mph (64 km/h). Moving inland, the system rapidly weakened as it continued to recurve to the northeast, further degenerating to tropical depression strength at 0000 UTC on August 11 while situated over Georgia. Based on weather station observations, the storm was analyzed to have transitioned into an extratropical cyclone later that day. The extratropical storm strengthened slightly over the Mid-Atlantic states, before exiting into the Atlantic Ocean near the Virginia Capes. The storm system progressed eastward across the ocean before dissipating at 1800 UTC on August 14.

== Preparations and impact ==
=== The Bahamas and Cuba ===
Passing through The Bahamas on August 6–7, the tropical storm caused minor damage on the islands. Due to the rough seas, ships were taken to Nassau Harbor to ride out the storm. The storm passed without any disruption of shipping services. However, the flying boat Topsy Fish, containing two people, became lost over Bahamian waters on August 8. The plane and crew were later found north of Andros Island by a Miami relief plane and a boat from Nassau three days later. Cuba, located south of the storm throughout its duration, reported minimal effects from the hurricane, other than a lowering of barometric pressures as reported by José Carlos Millás, then-chief of the Cuban National Observatory. However, occasional thunderstorm activity fueled by the hurricane dropped rainfall over the island, and the storm generated heavy seas at the Cuban coast.

=== Florida ===
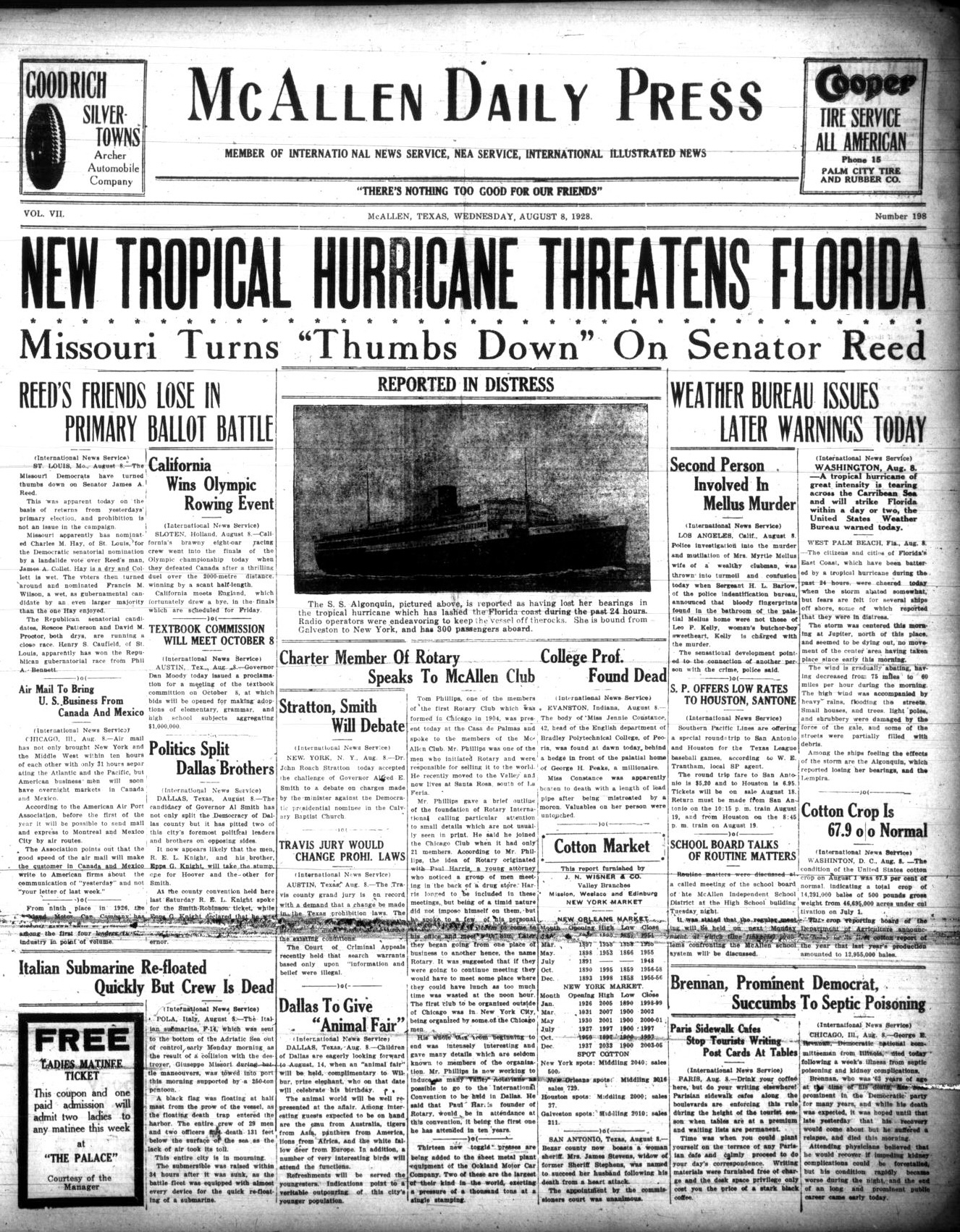
Front Page of the McAllen Daily Press on August 8, coverage of the hurricane’s impact in Florida

Upon notification that a newly formed tropical cyclone was approaching the Florida coast, the Weather Bureau posted storm warnings for coastal areas between Key West and West Palm Beach, Florida. Later on August 6, warnings were lowered in Key West, but the warning area was extended north to Titusville, Florida. Vessels and small craft located offshore north of Miami, Florida were notified to advise caution for the oncoming tropical disturbance. As the storm approached the coast, more accurate forecasts allowed vessels to be cautioned as far north as Hatteras, North Carolina. Storm warnings between Jupiter and Daytona, Florida were upgraded to hurricane warnings on August 7, in accordance with the storm's upgrade to hurricane intensity. After moving inland, hurricane warnings were lowered, but emergency warnings for the storm's potential effects were posted for the interior of the Florida peninsula north of 28°N the following day. Northwest storm warnings were issued in Tampa, while northeast storm warnings were issued from Tampa north to Apalachicola, Florida. All warnings were eventually lowered following the storm's dissipation.

Approaching the Floridian coast as an intensifying hurricane, the storm initially turned away from the peninsula for a short period of time on August 7, after nearly making landfall on West Palm Beach. Strong gusts of at least 30 mph (48 km/h) and squally weather impacted the city, but did not cause any damage. However, telecommunications in the city were temporarily disrupted due to the storm. In Jupiter, stronger gusts reaching 60 mph (97 km/h) were reported, but did not cause any damage as well. However, the hurricane's recurvature offshore was short lived, and the system eventually made its landfall near Fort Pierce, Florida early on August 8. Offshore, the USAHS Algonquin, a cruise ship belonging to the Clyde-Mallory cruise line, was caught in the storm, but managed to reach its destination of New York, New York without any major problems. The Honduran freighter Lempira, which had also recorded the lowest barometric pressure associated with the hurricane, experienced considerable damage due to the strong seas. The ship lost all of its lifeboats, and as a result the United Fruit Company line was sent to accompany the damaged ship. Inland, damage was concentrated in an area extending from Jupiter to the border between Florida and Georgia. The hurricane's landfall on the peninsula was attended by torrential rainfall, which damaged crops, particularly citrus. Rainfall peaked at 14.5 in (370 mm) in St. Cloud over a five-day period from August 7–12. There, the nearby East Lake Tohopekaliga began to overflow, threatening property and crops. Losses to the citrus crop were estimated by the Florida Citrus Exchange to be equivalent to 1 million boxes of citrus. However, damage to citrus in the Kissimmee area was comparatively less, and was limited to unripe fruit. Lake Okeechobee's water level rose by 2 ft (0.61 m) as a result of floodwater rushing into the lake. Damage along the lake's shores mostly occurred to the north. To the south, in Clewiston, minor damage was confined to trees and windows. Two deaths occurred in the vicinity of the Indian River; these were the only deaths associated with the hurricane in the state. Numerous highways were also washed out by the rains, especially on Florida's south-central east coast. Portions of State Road 4 were covered in debris strewn by strong winds. Damage to the state's road systems was estimated at $100,000 by the former Florida State Highway Commission. Bridges were also badly damaged, with some needing replacement.

Alongside the heavy rainfall, strong winds were reported. Large live oak trees were uprooted, especially in Osceola, Brevard, Orange, and Marion counties in Florida. Initial estimates of property damage in several cities on Florida's mid-eastern coast reached $5 million, though this was later drastically scaled down. In Sebastian, winds were estimated at 100 mph (160 km/h). Due to the high winds, rail service on the Florida East Coast Railway was halted 3 mi (4.8 km) north of Jupiter after winds became unsuitable for continued travel. Portions of the railway were also flooded in water. The train station in Fort Pierce was later unroofed. Many of the state's coastal beaches suffered from window damage and damage to vegetation caused by strong winds. An estimated 75% of structures in Fort Pierce and 50% of structures in Vero Beach were estimated to have been damaged by the strong winds, particularly in the form of torn roofs. A report suggested that damage from those two cities reached at least $1 million. The strong winds also hampered telephone and telegraph networks across the state, with losses as a result in excess of $1,000. Power transmission lines belonging to the Florida Power & Light Company were downed, causing a widespread power outage along the coast from Titusville to West Palm Beach. Thus, services requiring electric power were postponed until power was later restored. In Stuart, failure of the electric pumps led to loss of telecommunications and the local water supply. In Melbourne, additional power lines were downed, and buildings experienced awning damage. Portions of Central Florida also saw considerable damage. In Winter Haven, winds were reported to have reached 75 mph (121 km/h), before power was cut. A hotel in the city collapsed, and numerous houses were unroofed. Property damage in Kissimmee and Haines City was severe, with many collapsed buildings. In Haines City, a large garage collapsed, destroying automobiles parked within. Nearby in Lakeland, there was less damage, though winds estimated at 50 mph (80 km/h) tore signs and awnings. Effects of the storm in Tampa were comparatively less, though a lack of communications between the city and other locations led to speculation that Tampa had been severely hit. At nearby Clearwater, Florida, boats were run aground at the harbor, causing some damage. Similar conditions were felt in Ocala, though in some suburban areas trees were felled by the strong winds. Bus service in the area was delayed due to debris covering roadways.

=== Elsewhere in the United States ===
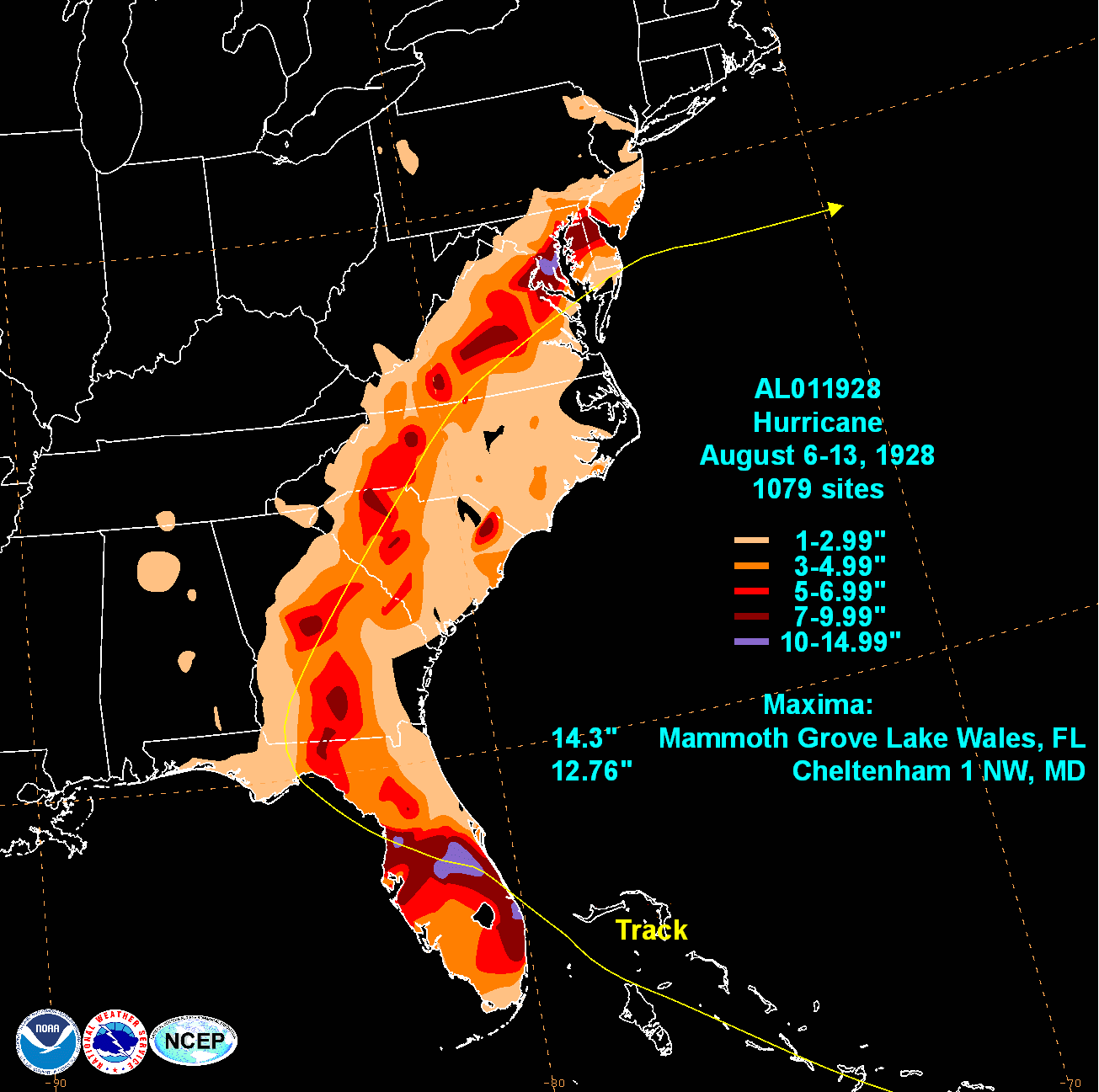
Map depicting the total precipitation from the hurricane across Florida and the U.S East Coast

Upon the hurricane's second landfall on the Florida Panhandle on August 10, wind effects were much less significant, though the storm dropped widespread rainfall throughout its remaining path. Aided by orthographic lift from the Appalachian Mountains, the rainfall caused numerous reports of flood damage across the Southeast and Mid-Atlantic states. For any given 50,000 mi^{2} (130,000 km^{2}) area of land affected by the storm, the maximum average rainfall was 6.4 in (160 mm). In southern and central Georgia, flood warnings were issued due to the potential for flood impacts late on August 10. In Macon, Georgia, 8.5 in (220 mm) of rain was recorded in a 16-hour period. The Ocmulgee River, which runs through Macon, began to rise past flood stage as a result, causing the lower areas of the city to be inundated. Trees were also downed due to strong winds. Portions of the Central of Georgia Railway were washed out, forcing trains to be redirected. In Thomasville, Georgia, highways leading to Florida were rendered impassable due to blocking debris. In Valdosta, Georgia, a torn roof cut through several power lines, causing electrical disruptions in the city. Similar impacts were felt in Augusta, Georgia, where strong winds toppled trees, damaged cottages, and severed telecommunication lines. Five people there were injured. In addition, a tornado occurred nearby, damaging houses and flattening trees.

Further east in the Carolinas, five people were killed in the Piedmont region due to floods caused by the passing storm. Torrential rainfall in the area resulted in disruption of power, communications, and traffic. Precipitation in those two states peaked at 9 in (230 mm) in western North Carolina. In South Carolina, the heavy rainfall forced the issuance of flood warnings on the rising Santee River and its tributaries. The Broad and Congaree Rivers in South Carolina later set high water level records due in part to the saturated soils caused by the storm. The storm reached Virginia by August 12, resulting in additional flooding. A weather station in Richmond, Virginia recorded a minimum barometric pressure of 1,000 mbar (1,000 hPa; 30 inHg). There, the James and Rivanna Rivers exceeded their respective flood stages, washing out peripheral crops. Offshore the Mid-Atlantic states, over 100 people were rescued after rough waves swept them away. Moderate gales associated with the storm were reported as far north as New York.

== See also ==
- 1926 Nassau hurricane
- 1933 Treasure Coast hurricane
- Hurricane Five (1933)
