= Raven Cliff Falls (South Carolina) =

Tallest waterfall in South Carolina

Coordinates: 35°06′20″N 82°39′39″W

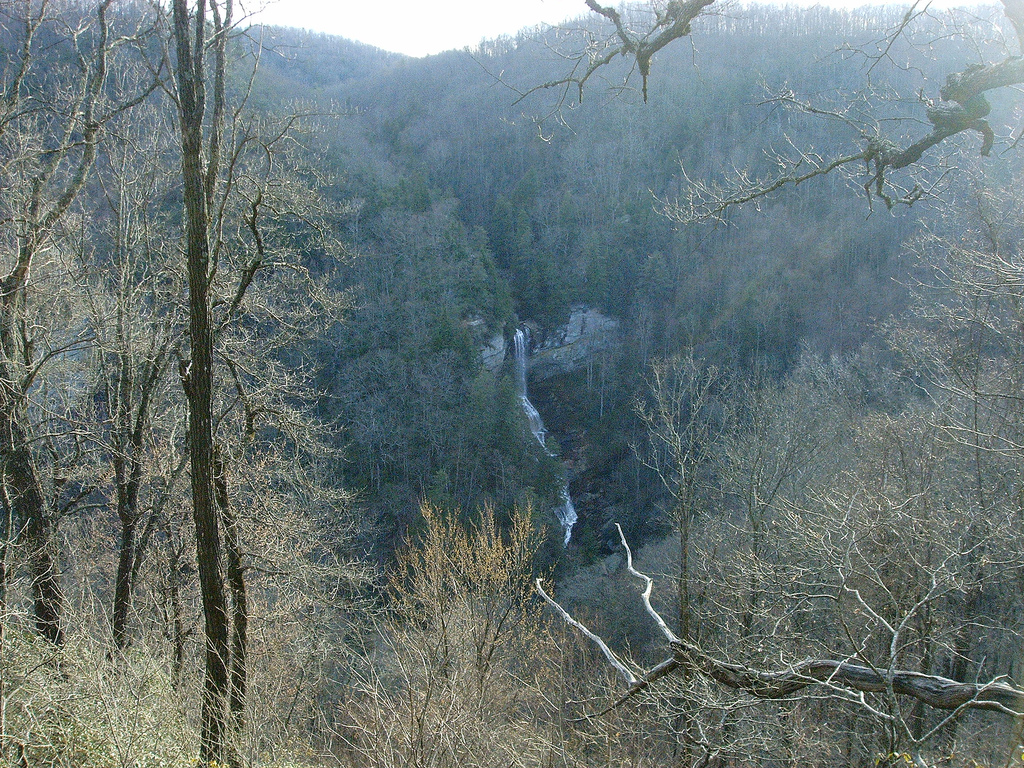

Raven Cliff Falls on Matthews Creek in Caesars Head State Park, Greenville County, South Carolina, is the tallest waterfall in South Carolina. Although the waterfall is described as having a 400-foot drop, topographic maps suggest a height between 320 and 350 feet.

== See also ==
- List of waterfalls
