= Caesars Head =

Mountain in South Carolina, US

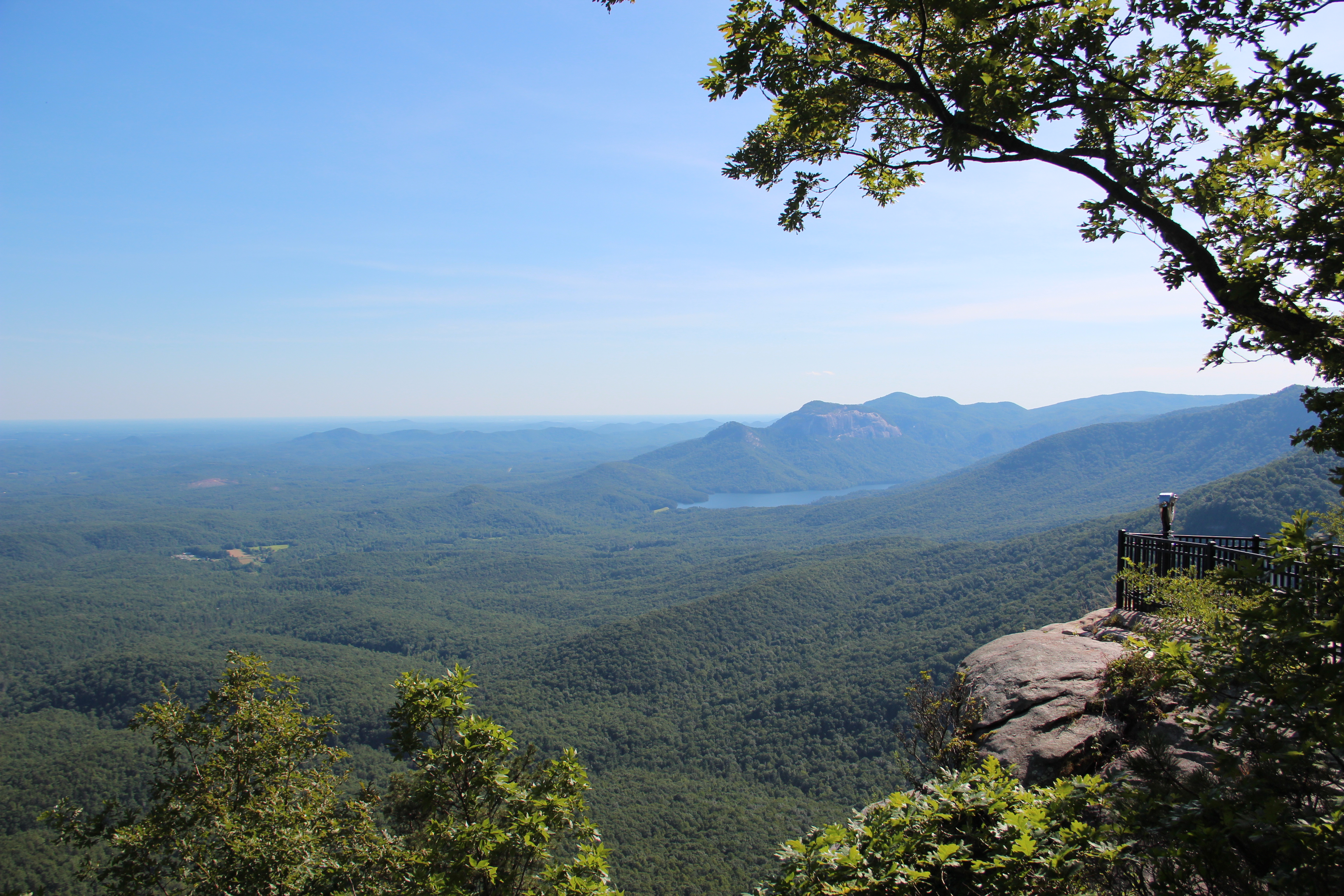
- View from Caesars Head, 2019

Highest point
- Elevation: 3,215 feet (980 m)
- Coordinates: 35°6′20″N 82°37′39″W

Geography
- Location within South Carolina

Caesars Head is a mountain within Caesars Head State Park in northern Greenville County, South Carolina. The summit has an elevation of 3,215 feet (980 m). The radio tower for TV station WYFF is nearby. Housing developments on top of the mountain are part of the Caesars Head census-designated place.

== Climate ==
Caesars Head has an oceanic climate (Cfb), a rarity for South Carolina, due to its high elevation, with warm summers and mild winters.

Climate data for Caesars Head, South Carolina (3,200 ft or 980 m AMSL), 1991–2020 normals, extremes 1925–present
Month	Jan	Feb	Mar	Apr	May	Jun	Jul	Aug	Sep	Oct	Nov	Dec	Year
Record high °F (°C)	73 (23)	74 (23)	85 (29)	90 (32)	98 (37)	97 (36)	99 (37)	99 (37)	98 (37)	89 (32)	79 (26)	75 (24)	99 (37)
Mean maximum °F (°C)	61.8 (16.6)	64.6 (18.1)	74.5 (23.6)	79.2 (26.2)	81.3 (27.4)	84.4 (29.1)	85.0 (29.4)	83.7 (28.7)	79.8 (26.6)	74.9 (23.8)	69.1 (20.6)	62.1 (16.7)	87.0 (30.6)
Mean daily maximum °F (°C)	44.8 (7.1)	48.3 (9.1)	55.9 (13.3)	65.0 (18.3)	70.0 (21.1)	75.0 (23.9)	77.6 (25.3)	76.2 (24.6)	71.1 (21.7)	62.9 (17.2)	54.9 (12.7)	47.6 (8.7)	62.4 (16.9)
Daily mean °F (°C)	36.3 (2.4)	39.3 (4.1)	46.3 (7.9)	54.7 (12.6)	61.6 (16.4)	67.7 (19.8)	70.7 (21.5)	69.4 (20.8)	64.3 (17.9)	55.3 (12.9)	46.6 (8.1)	39.9 (4.4)	54.3 (12.4)
Mean daily minimum °F (°C)	27.9 (−2.3)	30.3 (−0.9)	36.6 (2.6)	44.4 (6.9)	53.2 (11.8)	60.4 (15.8)	63.9 (17.7)	62.6 (17.0)	57.6 (14.2)	47.8 (8.8)	38.2 (3.4)	32.1 (0.1)	46.3 (7.9)
Mean minimum °F (°C)	9.1 (−12.7)	13.2 (−10.4)	18.2 (−7.7)	28.9 (−1.7)	40.0 (4.4)	51.1 (10.6)	57.7 (14.3)	56.1 (13.4)	46.3 (7.9)	33.0 (0.6)	22.4 (−5.3)	16.0 (−8.9)	5.9 (−14.5)
Record low °F (°C)	−19 (−28)	−6 (−21)	1 (−17)	17 (−8)	23 (−5)	30 (−1)	42 (6)	45 (7)	28 (−2)	23 (−5)	−1 (−18)	−5 (−21)	−19 (−28)
Average precipitation inches (mm)	6.02 (153)	4.82 (122)	5.17 (131)	5.93 (151)	6.11 (155)	6.93 (176)	7.02 (178)	6.97 (177)	6.62 (168)	5.60 (142)	5.93 (151)	7.08 (180)	74.20 (1,885)
Average snowfall inches (cm)	2.7 (6.9)	1.6 (4.1)	0.3 (0.76)	0.0 (0.0)	0.1 (0.25)	0.0 (0.0)	0.0 (0.0)	0.0 (0.0)	0.0 (0.0)	0.0 (0.0)	0.0 (0.0)	2.6 (6.6)	7.3 (19)
Average precipitation days (≥ 0.01 in)	9.4	9.8	11.0	10.5	11.2	14.1	16.9	15.3	9.7	8.2	9.6	10.0	135.7
Average snowy days (≥ 0.1 in)	0.7	0.9	0.4	0.0	0.0	0.0	0.0	0.0	0.0	0.0	0.0	0.6	2.6
Source: NOAA

== See also ==
- Caesars Head State Park
