= Hurricane Fifi =

Category 2 Atlantic hurricane in 1974

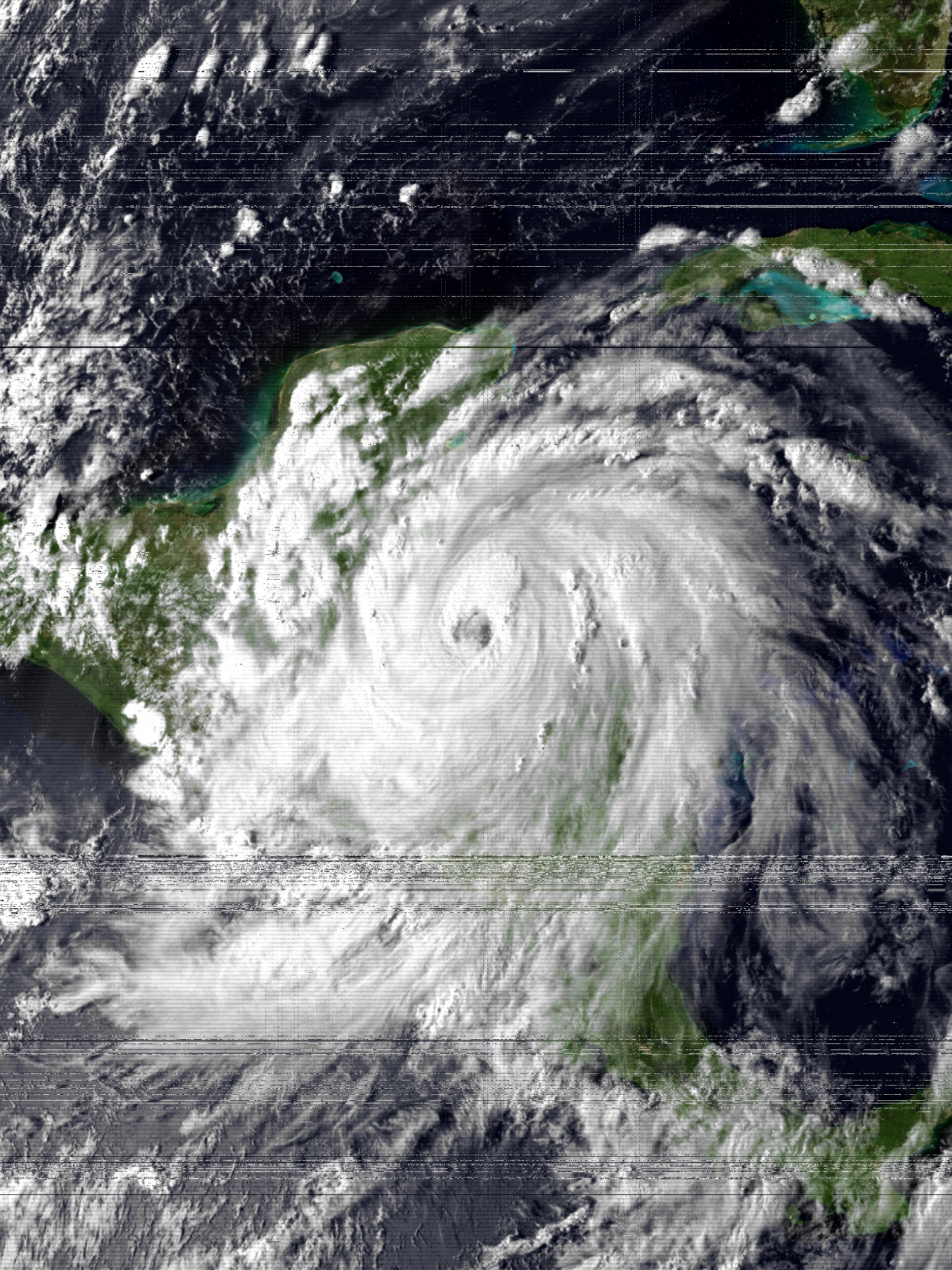
- Hurricane Fifi north of Honduras at peak intensity on September 18

Meteorological history
- Formed: September 14, 1974
- Dissipated: September 21, 1974

Category 2 hurricane
- 1-minute sustained (SSHWS/NWS)
- Highest winds: 100 mph (155 km/h)
- Lowest pressure: 971 mbar (hPa); 28.67 inHg

Overall effects
- Fatalities: 8,210 (3rd-deadliest Atlantic hurricane on record)
- Damage: $1.8 billion (1974 USD)
- Areas affected: Puerto Rico, Hispaniola, Jamaica, Nicaragua, Honduras, Belize, El Salvador, Guatemala, Mexico
- IBTrACS
- Part of the 1974 Atlantic hurricane season

Hurricane Fifi was a catastrophic tropical cyclone that killed over 8,000 people in Honduras in September 1974, ranking it as the third deadliest Atlantic hurricane on record, only behind Hurricane Mitch in 1998, and the 1780 hurricane. Fifi is also the first billion-dollar hurricane not to make landfall in the United States. Originating from a strong tropical wave on September 14, the system steadily tracked west-northwestward through the eastern Caribbean. On September 16, the depression intensified into Tropical Storm Fifi just off the coast of Jamaica. The storm quickly intensified into a hurricane the following afternoon and attained its peak intensity on September 18 as a strong Category 2 hurricane. Maintaining hurricane intensity, Fifi brushed the northern coast of Honduras before making landfall in Belize the following day. The storm quickly weakened after landfall, becoming a depression late on September 20, dissipating the following day. The remnants led to the formation of Hurricane Orlene in the eastern Pacific Ocean.

Along its path, Fifi impacted nine countries, leaving over 8,200 fatalities and $1.8 billion (1974 USD; $11.8 billion 2026 USD) in damages. Most of the loss of life and damage occurred in Honduras where rainfall from the hurricane, peaking around 24 in (610 mm), triggered widespread flash flooding and mudslides. In a single town, between 2,000 and 5,000 people were killed overnight after a massive flood inundated the area. Fifi brought continuous rainfall to the area for three days, hampering relief efforts in what was the worst disaster in Honduras' history at the time. In nearby Guatemala, an additional 200 people were killed by severe flooding, making Fifi the worst hurricane to impact the country in nearly 20 years. Following the catastrophic damage wrought by the storm, relief agencies from around the world flew in emergency supplies to assist the hundreds of thousands of homeless people. Countries closer to Honduras, such as the United States, set up city donation centers that would send supplies to the country. In efforts to prevent the spread of post-storm diseases, the government allowed the burning of bodies as they were recovered. In a single day, up to 6,000 bodies were burned. Due to the extreme damage and loss of life, the name was retired from the list of Atlantic hurricane names and has not been used since.

== Meteorological history ==
Map plotting the storm's track and intensity, according to the Saffir–Simpson scale Map key Saffir–Simpson scale Tropical depression (≤38 mph, ≤62 km/h) Tropical storm (39–73 mph, 63–118 km/h) Category 1 (74–95 mph, 119–153 km/h) Category 2 (96–110 mph, 154–177 km/h) Category 3 (111–129 mph, 178–208 km/h) Category 4 (130–156 mph, 209–251 km/h) Category 5 (≥157 mph, ≥252 km/h) Unknown Storm type Tropical cyclone Subtropical cyclone Extratropical cyclone, remnant low, tropical disturbance, or monsoon depression

Hurricane Fifi originated from a tropical wave that moved off the west coast of Africa on September 8. As the storm entered the Atlantic, satellite imagery showed that the system was already well-developed. Traveling westward, the wave entered the Caribbean Sea by September 13. Soon after emerging into the Caribbean, convective activity quickly increased. The following day, a US Navy reconnaissance aircraft flew into the system and found a developing low-level circulation. Operationally, the system was not declared a tropical depression by the National Hurricane Center (NHC) until late on September 15; however, in the Atlantic hurricane database, it was determined that it had become a tropical depression during the afternoon of September 14. The NHC initially forecast the depression to continue its west-northwest track, eventually brushing Cuba, although the storm never took the northerly turn.

The depression continued to organize as it turned westward, and late on September 16 the system intensified into Tropical Storm Fifi while just south of Jamaica. As it moved due west, the storm intensified, attaining hurricane status roughly 24 hours after being named following the formation of an eyewall feature. At that time, the storm was asymmetrical, with gale-force winds extending up to 100 mi (160 km) to the north and up to 50 mi (80 km) to the south. The storm turned slightly southwestward, and by September 18, Fifi reached its peak intensity with maximum sustained winds of 110 mph (180 km/h) and a barometric pressure of 971 mbar (hPa; 28.67 inHg). This made Fifi a high-end Category 2 hurricane on the Saffir–Simpson hurricane scale, which had been adopted the previous year. Around this time, the hurricane had nearly doubled in size, with a gale diameter now covering an area 300 mi (480 km) across.

Although earlier in the season Hurricane Carmen had attained Category 4 status in a similar location, Fifi was unable to intensify further due to its proximity to land. Most of the southern portion of the circulation was inhibited by the mountains of Honduras as it passed within 20 mi (32 km) of the coast. Fifi maintained its peak intensity for roughly 24 hours until it began to weaken shortly before making landfall near Placencia, Belize with winds of 105 mph (169 km/h). After moving inland, the hurricane weakened to a tropical storm and further deteriorated into a tropical depression once it moved over southwestern Mexico late on September 20. The cyclone dissipated on September 21 while over Mexico, and its remnants contributed to the formation of Hurricane Orlene in the Eastern Pacific.

== Preparations and impacts ==
=== Greater Antilles ===
On September 15, the Government of Jamaica began preparing for potential impacts from the storm. Residents were advised to be aware of possible rain squalls in association with the storm. Additionally, small craft advisories were issued due to rough seas produced by the then-tropical depression. Passing south of Jamaica as a tropical storm, Fifi brought heavy rains to the mountainous island, exceeding 8 in (200 mm) in some locations. Severe flooding affected parts of Kingston, leaving some areas under 2 ft (0.61 m) of water. Damages from the storm amounted to hundreds of thousands of dollars, although no loss of life was reported. In nearby Hispaniola, the system produced moderate rainfall that triggered flash flooding. Small craft advisories were also issued for portions of southern Cuba as Fifi bypassed Jamaica. Ships were advised to remain in port throughout the Cayman Islands as residents began to prepare for hurricane-force winds.

=== Honduras ===
Deadliest Atlantic hurricanes
| Rank | Hurricane | Season | Fatalities |
|---|---|---|---|
| 1 | ? "Great Hurricane" | 1780 | 22,000–27,501 |
| 2 | 5 Mitch | 1998 | 11,374+ |
| 3 | 2 Fifi | 1974 | 8,210–10,000 |
| 4 | 4 "Galveston" | 1900 | 8,000–12,000 |
| 5 | 4 Flora | 1963 | 7,193 |
| 6 | ? "Pointe-à-Pitre" | 1776 | 6,000+ |
| 7 | 5 "Okeechobee" | 1928 | 4,112+ |
| 8 | ? "Newfoundland" | 1775 | 4,000–4,163 |
| 9 | 3 "Monterrey" | 1909 | 4,000 |
| 10 | 4 "San Ciriaco" | 1899 | 3,855 |

Fifi first became a threat to Honduras on September 17 when the storm reached hurricane strength, at which point forecasters revised their forecasts to anticipate landfall in Honduras or Nicaragua on September 18 or 19. In response, officials in Honduras urged hundreds of thousands of residents to evacuate from coastal and flood-prone areas. Despite the warning, relatively few heeded these evacuation orders, likely playing a role in the large loss of life following the storm.

During the first day of the hurricane's onslaught, the region experienced winds of up to 132 mph (212 km/h) and unrelenting rainfall. The first reports of damage from the Honduran government via radio stated that 14 people had been killed while over 100 were missing. In just 24 hours, 182 towns and villages were completely destroyed. According to the Red Cross, between 800 and 1,200 people died within 12 hours of Fifi's landfall in Honduras. Buses driving through mountain passes skidded off the sides of cliffs due to slick roads, killing numerous people. Flash floods destroyed thousands of homes and isolated numerous towns. Waves, reaching 10 ft (3.0 m) in height, destroyed moorings and grounded numerous ships.

Continuous rain fell throughout September 19, resulting in widespread mudslides that killed over 2,000 people. A large mudslide blocked the Choloma River, preventing water from the river and the accumulated 20 in (510 mm) of rain caused by Fifi from reaching the ocean. The waters were released from this natural dam on September 20, when a concrete bridge broke upstream and tore through the mudslide. The torrent of water flowed down the valley, triggering a massive flood. The city of Choloma was decimated, with an estimated 2,800–5,000 people killed out of a population of 7,000. The flood occurred during the nighttime, so most residents were unaware of the impending catastrophe.

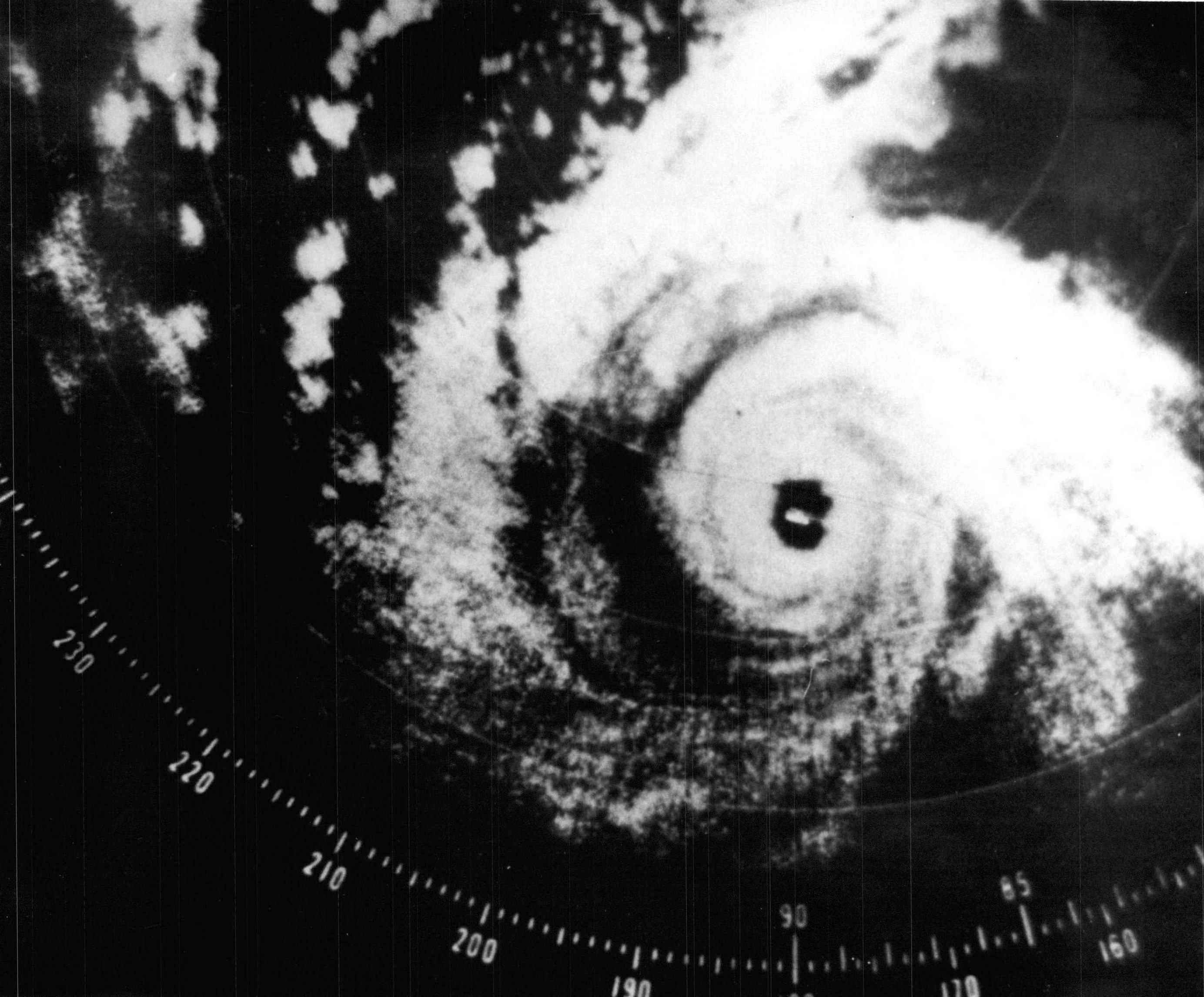
Radar image of Hurricane Fifi nearing landfall in Belize

Other towns along the coast suffered similar fates as Choloma. In Armenta, roughly 400 families disappeared after a large landslide buried the town. However, the town is hardly known by people in the country and reports from the area were scarce. Another coastal town, Omoa (population of 2,500 to 3,000) was completely destroyed overnight on September 19. All of the residents were assumed to have perished; however, like Armenta, few people know of the town and estimates of the fatalities in it ranged from 30 to 3,000.

Although by this time the storm was situated inland over Mexico, its circulation continued to produce thunderstorms over Honduras, hindering rescue efforts. Nighttime rescues were prevented by dense fog blanketing most of the mountain valleys. The city of La Ceiba, population 53,000, was completely isolated from surrounding areas. Many were feared dead as newspapers reported bodies floating down rivers.

The death toll rose by the hundreds every day; at one point, the official death toll was estimated as high as 10,000. There is still uncertainty in the total number of fatalities due to Fifi. In general, however, most estimates range from 8,000 to 10,000. Overall this ranked Fifi as the second-deadliest Atlantic hurricane on record at the time. It was eventually lowered to third after Hurricane Mitch in 1998 wrought similar destruction in the same region, leaving between 11,000 and 18,000 dead.

Throughout the country, Fifi inflicted nearly $1.8 billion (1974 USD; $11.8 billion 2026 USD) as part of what was, at the time, the worst natural disaster in Honduras' history. Due to the damage that Fifi caused, Fifi is the costliest Atlantic Hurricane to reach a maximum of Category 2. In certain coastal regions, only structures built on higher elevations were left standing. Many cities were more than 80% destroyed. Fifi demolished over 10,000 well-constructed homes throughout Honduras. An estimated 150,000 people were left homeless due to Fifi. However, the Honduran government estimated that between 350,000 and 500,000 were left homeless. The country's banana crop was completely destroyed by the hurricane; as a result, its economy was severely affected.

=== Elsewhere in Central America ===
Wettest tropical cyclones and their remnants in Nicaragua Highest-known totals
| Precipitation | | | Storm | Location | Ref. |
| Rank | mm | in | Storm | Location | Ref. |
|---|---|---|---|---|---|
| 1 | 1597 | 62.87 | Mitch 1998 | Picacho/Chinandega | |
| 2 | 674 | 26.55 | Eta 2020 | Puerto Corinto | |
| 3 | 500 | 19.69 | Joan 1988 | | |
| 4 | 447 | 17.60 | Gert 1993 | Chinandega | |
| 5 | 368 | 14.49 | Fifi 1974 | Chinandega | |
| 6 | 298 | 11.72 | Alma 2008 | Punto Sandino | |
| 7 | 272 | 10.70 | Cesar 1996 | Bluefields | |
| 8 | 231 | 9.10 | Ida 2009 | Puerto Cabezas | |
| 9 | 181 | 7.11 | Felix 2007 | Puerto Cabezas | |

Officials in Belize and Guatemala rushed to complete emergency precautions for the approaching hurricane. Much of Central America north of Nicaragua was impacted by the hurricane. Rainfall reaching 4 in (100 mm) affected areas as far north as Campeche, Mexico. At Chinandega, Nicaragua, rainfall from the storm amounted to 14.5 in (370 mm) over a four-day period. The heavy precipitation led to significant flooding across the country as dozens of rivers exceeded their banks; hundreds were left homeless. The communities of La Conquista, Dulce Nombre, San Gregorio and San Vicente were isolated by flood waters after roads leading to them were washed away. In Chiquito, Izapa and Tamarindo, more than ten homes were destroyed and 50 people left homeless due to the storm. After the Río Coco overflowed its banks in Jinotega, 120 homes were destroyed, leaving 113 families homeless. Numerous other communities sustained similar damage throughout the country, especially near the Honduras border. Hundreds of people in the town of Wiwili clung to treetops and roofs along the Coco River.

Although the storm made landfall in Belize, the country suffered considerably less damage than in nearby Honduras. However, winds up to 109 mph (175 km/h) were recorded. The combination of winds and torrential rains damaged or destroyed hundreds of homes in Belize. Waves along the coast reached 12 ft (3.7 m) above normal. Although torrential rains exceeding 24 in (610 mm) fell in nearby Honduras, only 6 in (150 mm) fell in the country. The country's $800,000 banana crop was completely destroyed by the storm. Despite the severity of the damage, there were no reports of fatalities in Belize. In Guatemala, the weakened storm brought extreme rainfall that caused extensive flash flooding. Numerous bridges, roads and homes were washed away or destroyed. At least 200 people were killed, making Fifi the deadliest in the country in nearly 20 years. In El Salvador, the outer bands of Fifi produced flooding rains that killed at least ten people. The outer fringes of the storm produced 4 in (100 mm) of rainfall as far north as Campeche. Mexico sustained little or no damage from Hurricane Fifi.

== Aftermath ==
Impact by area
| Region | Direct deaths | Damage |
|---|---|---|
| Jamaica | 0 | $1,000s |
| Honduras | 8,000–10,000 | $1.8 billion |
| Nicaragua | 0 | Unknown |
| Belize | 0 | $800,000+ |
| El Salvador | 10 | Unknown |
| Guatemala | 200 | Unknown |
| Mexico | 0 | Unknown |
| Total | 8,210+ | $1.8 billion+ |

=== Response and assistance ===
In the wake of the storm, relief agencies and the Honduras government were overwhelmed by the magnitude of the disaster. Rescue planes flown throughout the country reported that hundreds of bodies were floating in rivers and water covered areas once occupied by towns. For the first three days, relief efforts were generally minimal due to the extremely poor state of the roads across Honduras. Numerous countries send tonnes of aid to the battered country, although it was initially stockpiled by the government until it could be properly distributed. By September 24, planes filled with relief supplies were being flown to Honduras from the United States, Cuba, Costa Rica, El Salvador, Mexico, Guatemala and Venezuela. Relief crews, overwhelmed by the number of bodies, began taking desperate measures to prevent the spread of diseases. An estimated 5,000 to 6,000 bodies were burned by September 24.

Four helicopters supplied by the United States, from the Panama Canal, quickly began rescue missions. They airlifted survivors from flood waters and placed them on elevated land areas. The crew members reported that the people were desperate to get on the helicopters and during one mission, 34 people crowded on to one of the aircraft, which has a normal capacity of 15. Food packages dropped to survivors were fought over, some people reportedly fighting each other with machetes for the supplies. During several of the later rescue missions, people died from starvation and malnutrition on board the helicopters. From nearby Belize, Britain deployed 57 soldiers with motorboats to rush food to survivors in flooded regions. A group of 41 Cuban medical experts, including 21 doctors, treated nearly 900 in a period of two days.

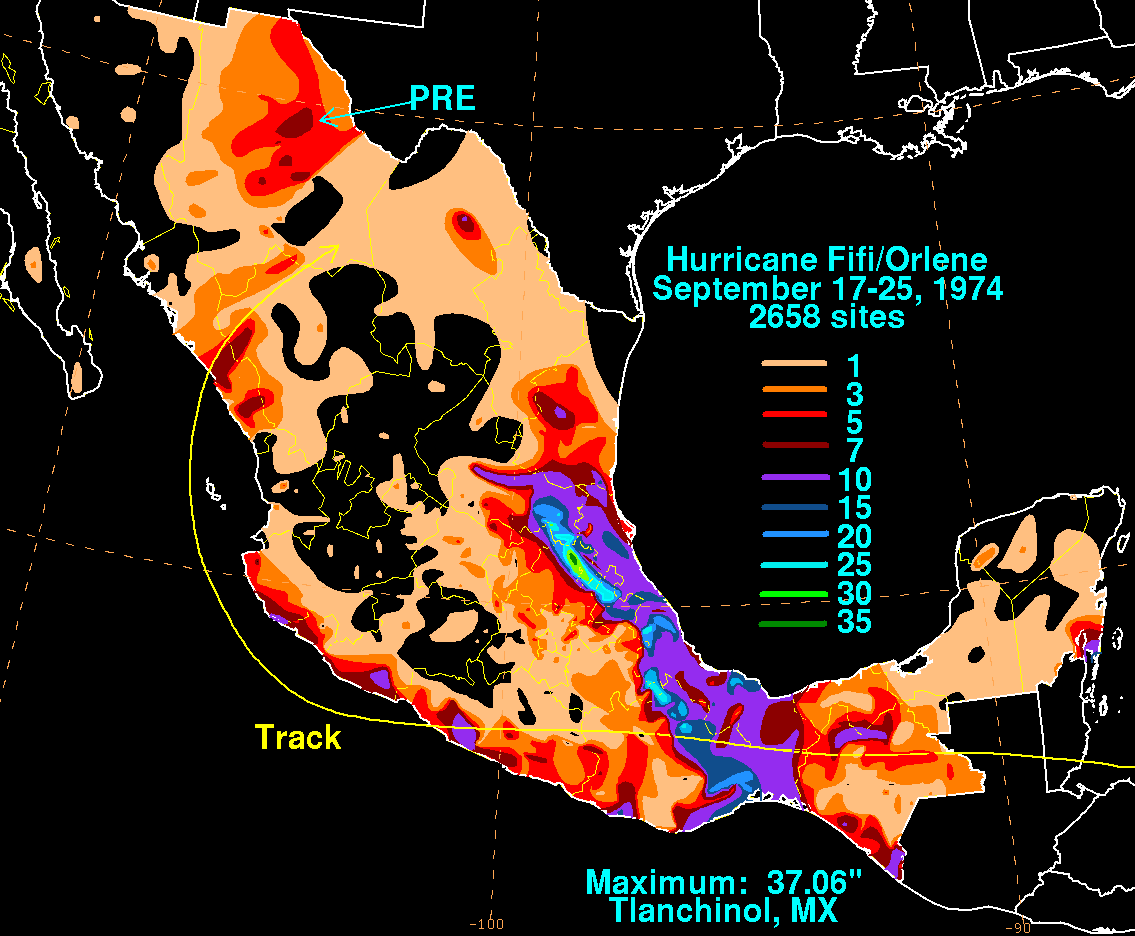
Storm total rainfall for hurricanes Fifi and Orlene in Mexico

By September 24, more than 350,000 people sought refuge in shelters set up throughout the country. Red Cross volunteers were overwhelmed by the number of families requesting help to find missing relatives. Relief planes sent by the United States were initially delayed by continued inclement weather. Several days after the storm's passage, they were able to land in the country. These planes were loaded with food, clothes, water, medicine and other emergency supplies. Juan Bautista described the disaster wrought by Fifi as "the worst moment in the nation's 150-year history since independence."

Donation centers were set up throughout major cities in the United States by the Honduran Government. They planned to fill three planes and five or six ships with supplies that would be brought to the country. In Miami, Florida, governor Reubin Askew asked all residents to donate to the Red Cross or Salvation Army to help those affected by the hurricane. In St. Petersburg, Florida, a team of 14 doctors was sent to the country on October 9. Other doctors set up fund drives, one set for $50,000; however, officials in Honduras believed that this would be nowhere near the necessary funds for what would become a multibillion-dollar disaster. Numerous other nations and relief agencies joined in the effort to aid Honduras in what was considered one of the largest relief operations in history. Days after the storm, brigades, deployed by the Honduran military, began to reach the hardest-hit areas as floodwaters started to recede.

From Miami alone, 14 tons of relief goods were donated to Honduras. Roughly a month after the storm struck, the United States had donated roughly 1.8 million pounds (816,000 kg) of relief supplies. Government agencies also began working on plans to revive the broken economy. An initial plan costing $5 million to restart the agricultural business was set up and another $15 million was set to be given out as a two-year loan. One group of people from a Baptist church in Texas spent $30,000 on a custom-designed food wagon to distribute food to the people of El Progreso. In some areas, residents did not know how to use certain supplies, such as toilet paper and tea bags, due to their culture and isolation from urban areas. "...a British helicopter team dropped toilet paper and tea bags to the people of El Progreso, who are unfamiliar with both items. Using the toilet paper as wrappers, the villagers smoked the tea."

In Honduras, the Red Cross and other relief agencies quickly attempted to unload planes to assure that supplies would reach victims. However, some of the supplies were hoarded by the Honduran military as they quickly went to unload the planes. One of the incidents took place after a plane carrying supplies from Argentina landed and the military forced the volunteer members away from the plane. Once in the hands of the military, the fate of the supplies was unknown. As the full amount of supplies did not reach victims, reports of people starving to death surfaced. Eventually, relief crews found these reports to be true as they distributed food to those who survived.

Following the storm, the country's economy suffered for two years. During this time, the annual deficit reached $200 million, against the annual income of $153 million.

=== Rebuilding ===
In 1977, a large-scale reconstruction project involving six villages across Honduras began. The first of the six project areas contained 121 homes with an average of 25 square meters of space. It was located along an important highway in northern Honduras; however, the rebuilding was initially delayed by erosion issues. The second plan consisted of 127 homes roughly a mile south of the first. The third, consisting of 26 concrete homes, was placed in the city of El Progreso. This project was determined to house the most people per home, roughly seven occupants for a preliminary total of 182 people. The fourth was the most isolated of the six planned constructions. In a rural area far outside urban regions, 92 homes were planned to be constructed. The fifth project, consisting of 33 homes, was placed close to the first project, having a similar access to the major highway. The final housing project, and largest, was set up south of the destroyed town of Choloma. A total of 600 homes, all built on concrete blocks and doubled up, were placed in this housing project.

On October 3, 1974, Guatemalan businessmen Dionisio Gutiérrez and Alfonso Bosch died when they went by plane to support the victims of Hurricane Fifi in Honduras. The plane was carrying a shipment of medicines that had been collected by the Rotary Club of Guatemala but was crashed by weather conditions and cargo near the village of Las Nubes. The descendants of the deceased, owners of companies such as Pollo Campero, Avícola Villalobos and Empacadora Toledo created the Juan Bautista Gutierrez Foundation to centralize a series of social projects that they had carried out for several years.

=== Retirement ===
On account of the severe damage and high death toll from the hurricane in the Atlantic basin, the name Fifi was retired at the end of the 1974 season. It will never again be used to name a tropical storm in the basin.

== See also ==
- List of Category 2 Atlantic hurricanes
- Hurricane Keith (2000)
- Hurricane Iris (2001)
- Hurricane Nana (2020)
