= 1909 Monterrey hurricane =

Category 3 Atlantic hurricane

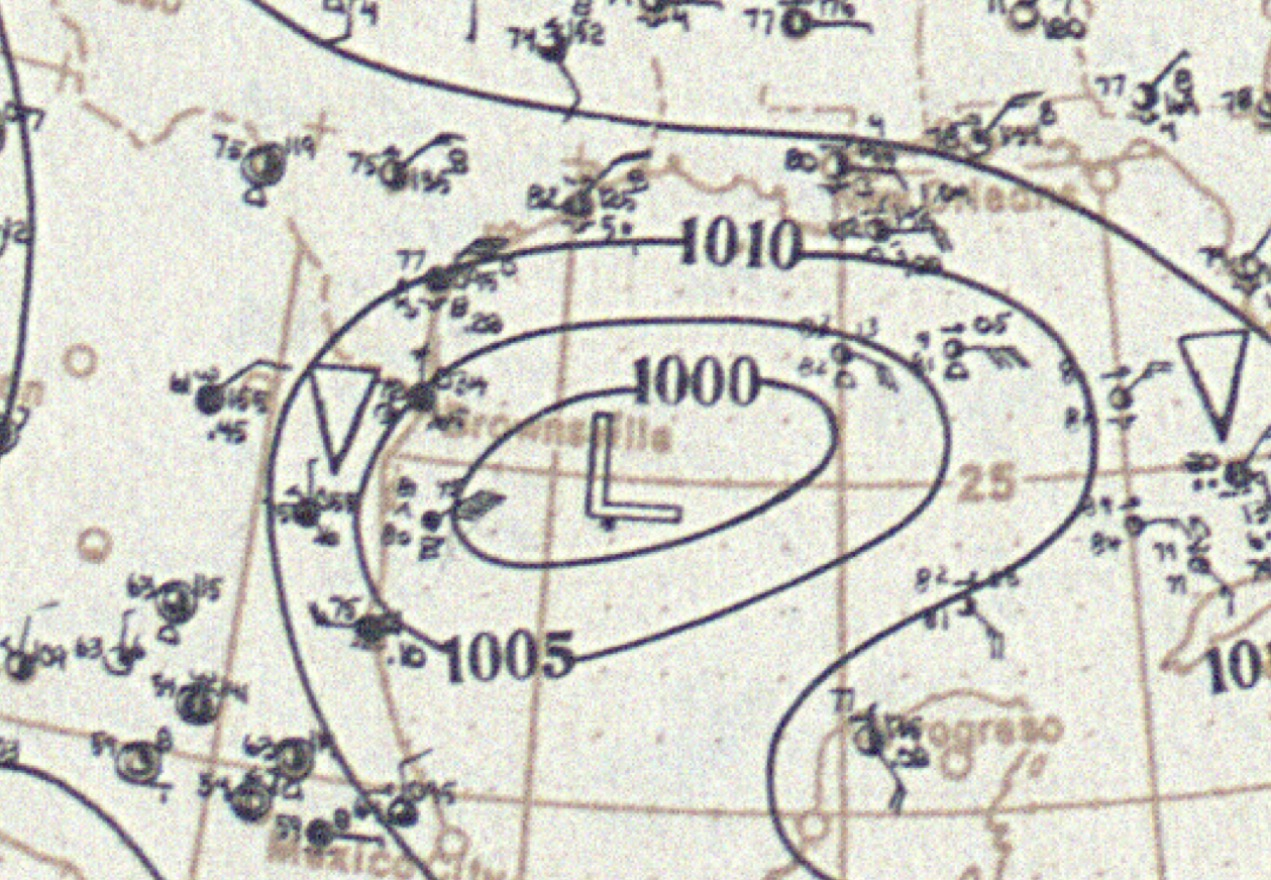
- Weather map of the hurricane nearing landfall in Mexico on August 27

Meteorological history
- Formed: August 20, 1909
- Dissipated: August 28, 1909

Category 3 major hurricane
- 1-minute sustained (SSHWS/NWS)
- Highest winds: 120 mph (195 km/h)
- Lowest pressure: 955 mbar (hPa); 28.20 inHg

Overall effects
- Fatalities: 4,000 total
- Damage: $50 million (1909 USD)
- Areas affected: Leeward Islands, Dominican Republic, Haiti, Cuba, Mexico, and Texas
- IBTrACS
- Part of the 1909 Atlantic hurricane season

The 1909 Monterrey hurricane was one of the deadliest Atlantic tropical cyclones on record, killing an estimated 4,000 people throughout Mexico, and is considered the deadliest hurricane in the country's recorded history. Originating from a tropical storm east of the Leeward Islands on August 20, the storm tracked west-northwest, entering the Caribbean as a minimal hurricane the next day. After striking Hispaniola on August 23, the hurricane made another landfall in eastern Cuba before reentering the Caribbean. Once back over open water, the storm intensified into a Category 3 hurricane and moved across the northern tip of the Yucatán Peninsula. By August 26, the storm had emerged into the Gulf of Mexico as a weakened, but regrouping system. It attained its peak winds of 120 mph (195 km/h) that evening. Maintaining this intensity, the system made landfall in the Mexican state of Tamaulipas late on August 27 and rapidly dissipated the following afternoon.

Throughout its existence, the hurricane remained relatively close to land, so consequently its effects were felt in many areas. Much of the northern Caribbean received moderate to heavy rainfall along with gusty winds during its passage; although only Haiti reported damage from it. Its effects were far more severe in Mexico where an estimated 4,000 people were killed by record-breaking floods triggered by the hurricane. The city of Monterrey received the worst damage: more than half of the structures in the city were flooded, hundreds were destroyed, and 20,000 people were left homeless. Damage from the storm in the country was estimated to have exceeded $50 million (1909 USD; $1.79 billion 2026 USD).

== Meteorological history ==
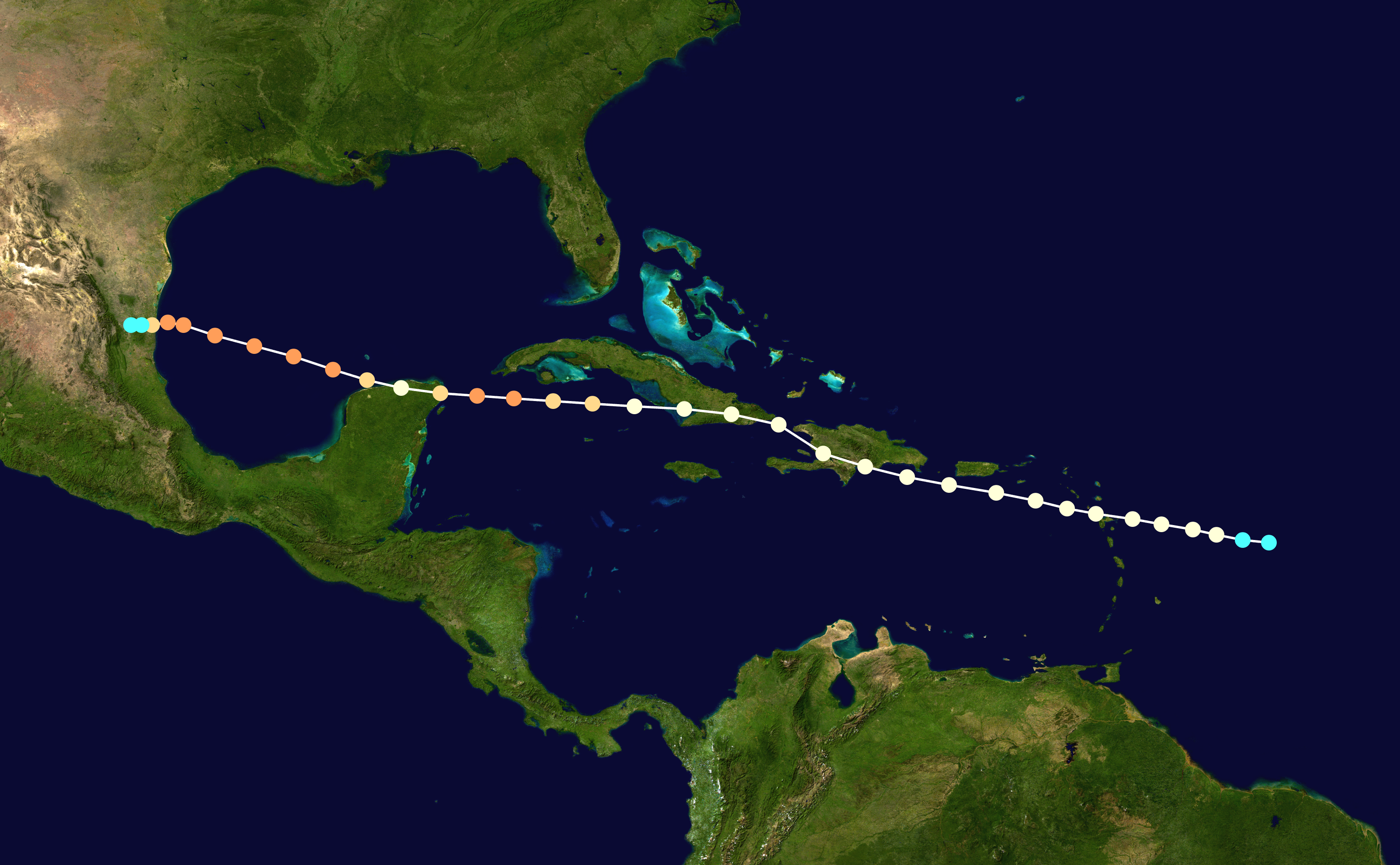
Map plotting the storm's track and intensity, according to the Saffir–Simpson scale Map key Saffir–Simpson scale Tropical depression (≤38 mph, ≤62 km/h) Tropical storm (39–73 mph, 63–118 km/h) Category 1 (74–95 mph, 119–153 km/h) Category 2 (96–110 mph, 154–177 km/h) Category 3 (111–129 mph, 178–208 km/h) Category 4 (130–156 mph, 209–251 km/h) Category 5 (≥157 mph, ≥252 km/h) Unknown Storm type Tropical cyclone Subtropical cyclone Extratropical cyclone, remnant low, tropical disturbance, or monsoon depression

The origins of the hurricane are uncertain due to a lack of ship reports in the western Atlantic Ocean. According to the Atlantic hurricane database, it was first identifiable as a tropical storm on August 20 to the east of the Leeward Islands. Tracking to the west-northwest, the storm quickly attained winds of 80 mph (130 km/h), equivalent to Category 1 status on the modern-day Saffir–Simpson hurricane scale. By the evening of August 21, the storm entered the Caribbean as it brushed the northern coast of Guadeloupe; intensification of the hurricane over the northeastern Caribbean was slow. Early on August 23, it made its first landfall with winds of 90 mph (145 km/h) in San Cristóbal Province, Dominican Republic, just southwest of the country's capital city of Santo Domingo.

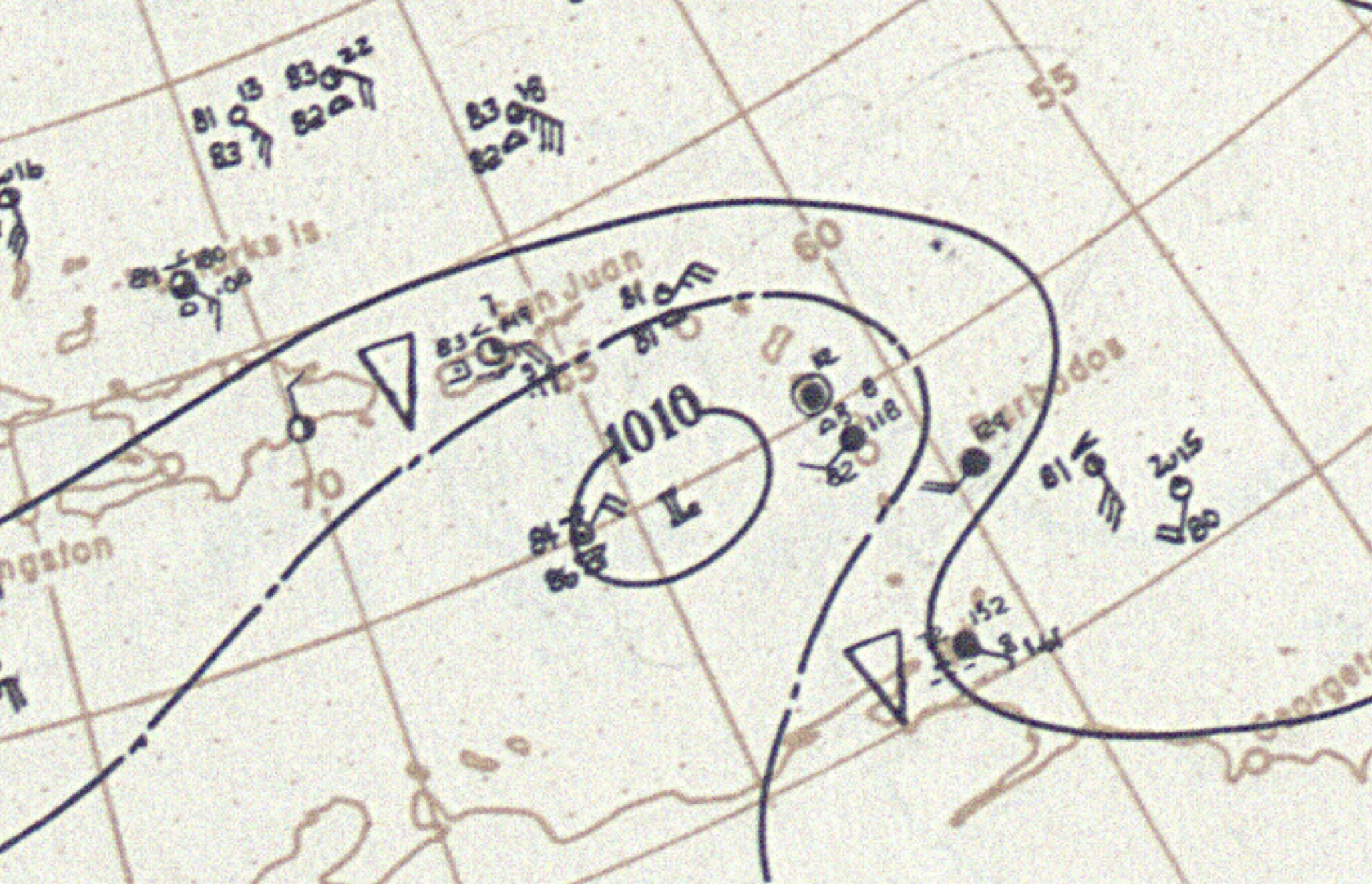
Weather map of the hurricane over the northeast Caribbean Sea on August 21

The hurricane weakened slightly over the mountainous terrain of Hispaniola, although it is believed to have maintained winds of at least 75 mph (120 km/h) based on damage reports in Haiti. Later on August 23, the storm "jumped" northward before making another landfall in the Cuban province of Guantánamo. Continuing towards the west-northwest, the hurricane regained strength as it moved over the northern Caribbean.

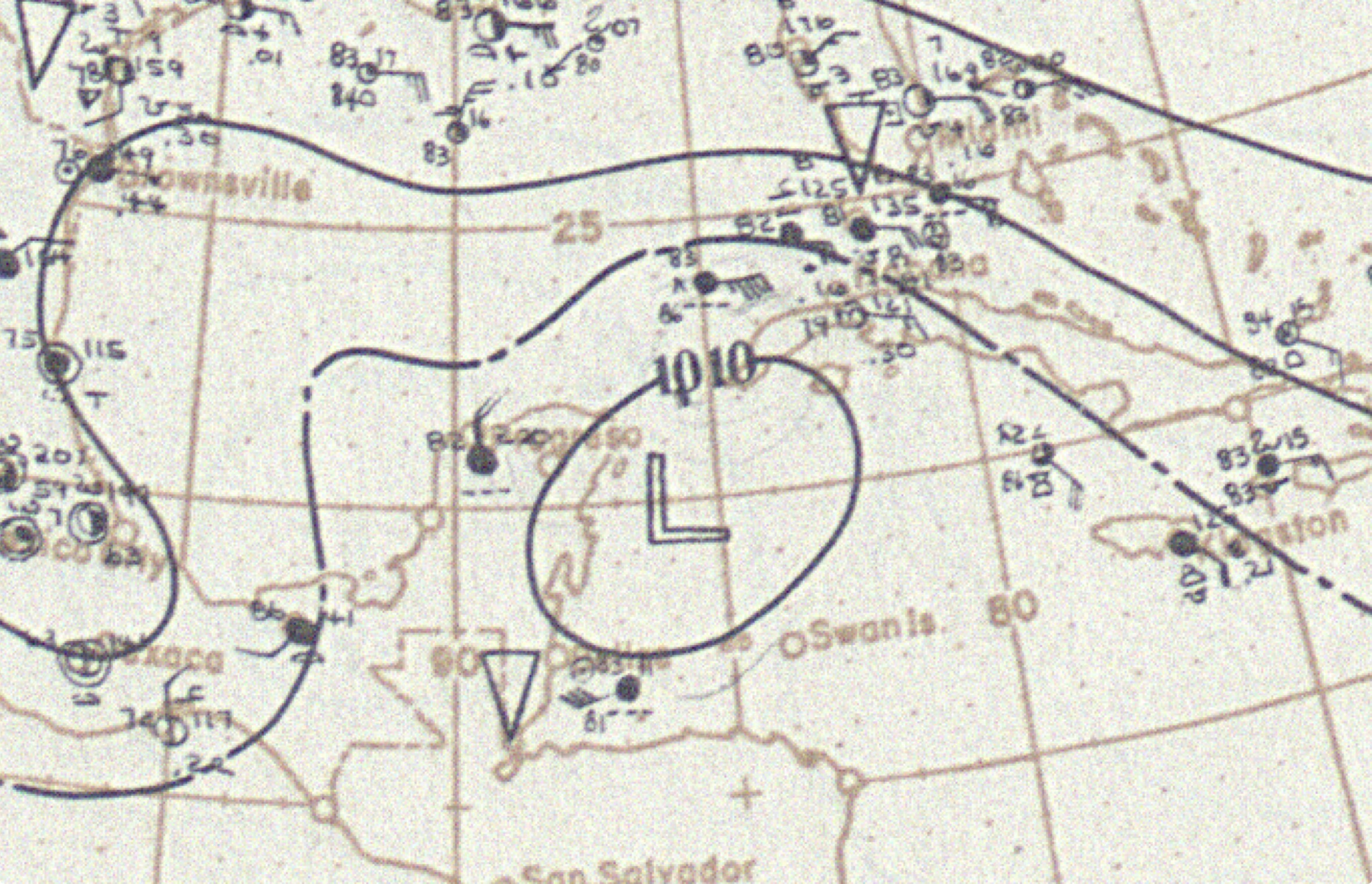
Surface weather map of the hurricane approaching the Yucatán Peninsula on August 25

During the afternoon of August 24, the system attained winds of 100 mph (160 km/h), corresponding to a Category 2 hurricane. Early the following morning, it further intensified to a Category 3 major hurricane, defined as having winds in excess of 111 mph (179 km/h), before making landfall in the Yucatán Peninsula near Cancún. After landfall the hurricane weakened considerably over land in the Yucatán Peninsula, but soon afterwards the storm emerged into the Gulf of Mexico within 12 hours and quickly re-intensified again to attain its peak winds of 120 mph (195 km/h) on August 26. It soon slowed and turned due west, maintaining its intensity. Late on August 27, the storm made its final landfall in the Mexican state of Tamaulipas. Rapid weakening took place as it drifted onshore into the mountainous terrain of Mexico, the storm then dissipated the following afternoon.

== Impact ==
=== Caribbean ===
Prior to the hurricane's devastating impacts in Mexico, it brought heavy rains and high winds to several of the northern Caribbean Islands. The first to be affected by the storm were the Leeward Islands; however, no known damage resulted from its passage. Moderate rain and gusty winds were reported in Puerto Rico as well as the Dominican Republic and Jamaica. In eastern Jamaica, between Aquavale and Hope, the banana crop was largely destroyed. Haiti suffered severe damage reported in many towns, with homes destroyed and many homeless. Much of Cuba was also impacted by the storm, with winds up to 60 mph (95 km/h) being recorded as far north as Havana.

=== Mexico ===
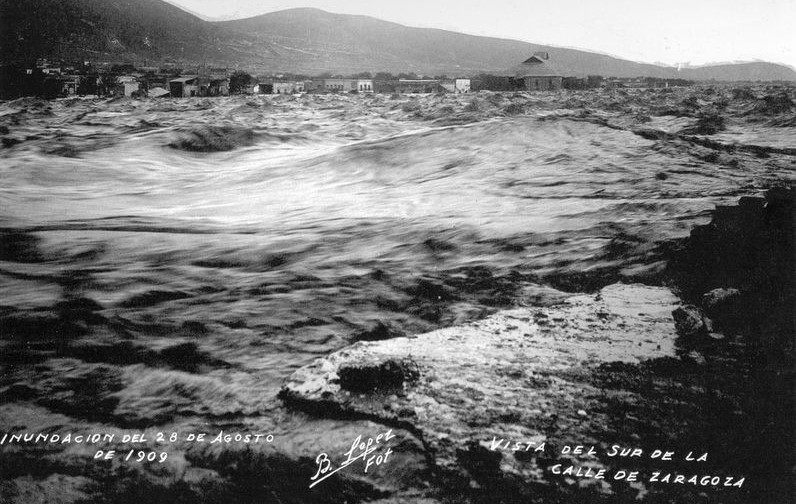
Catastrophic flooding in Monterrey during the storm

Although a borderline Category 2–3 hurricane when it made landfall in the Yucatán Peninsula, little is known about the storm's impact in the region. The United Fruit Company steamship, Cartago, encountered adverse conditions in the hurricane while traversing the Yucatán Channel about 25 mi (40 km) offshore. Rocked by severe winds up to 100 mph (160 km/h) and swells for 12 hours, the ship suffered damage to its pilothouse, starboard deck, and railings. Aside from seasickness, none of the vessel's 24 crewmen were injured. However, following the hurricane's second landfall, the resulting damage was catastrophic. During the overnight hours between August 27 and 28, cities along the coastline of Tamaulipas likely sustained severe damage from the hurricane's storm surge and high winds. Newspaper reports stated winds reached 60 mph (97 km/h) in Veracruz and 75 to 90 mph (121 to 145 km/h) from Tampico to Matamoros in Tamaulipas.

Deadliest Atlantic hurricanes
Rank	Hurricane	Season	Fatalities
1	? "Great Hurricane"	1780	22,000–27,501
2	5 Mitch	1998	11,374+
3	2 Fifi	1974	8,210–10,000
4	4 "Galveston"	1900	8,000–12,000
5	4 Flora	1963	7,193
6	? "Pointe-à-Pitre"	1776	6,000+
7	5 "Okeechobee"	1928	4,112+
8	? "Newfoundland"	1775	4,000–4,163
9	3 "Monterrey"	1909	4,000
10	4 "San Ciriaco"	1899	3,855

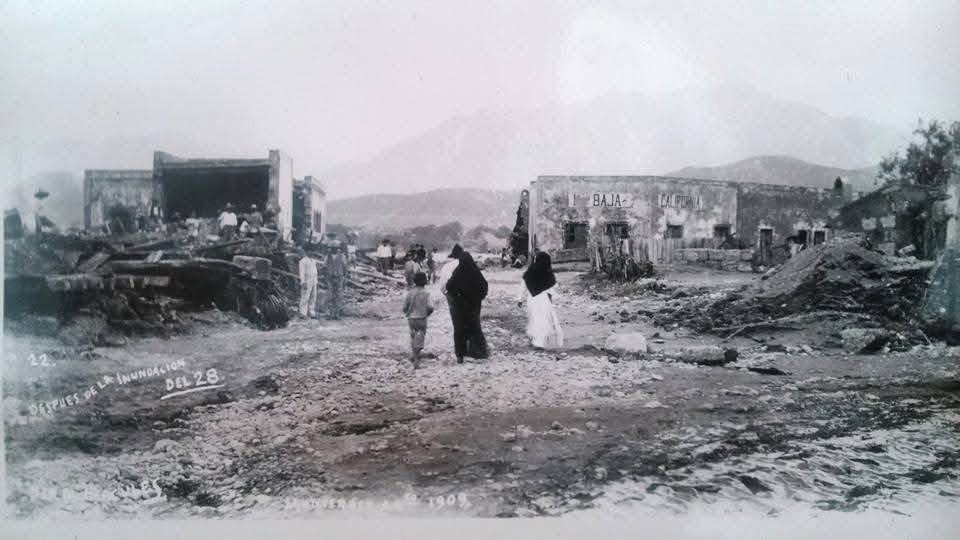
People stumble across the devastation in Monterrey after the flooding caused by the hurricane

The worst of the damage took place further inland, within the state of Nuevo León. There, torrential rainfall triggered a flood even exceeding 100-year flood values. According to meteorologists in Mexico, the storm dropped 17.5 in (440 mm) of rain over a 40‑hour span. Further rains fell for the following 32 hours, worsening the situation. Adobe homes that survived the initial onslaught collapsed in these rains, killing many people. The rising Santa Catarina River flowed into the San Juan River, causing an abrupt rise and subsequent overflow of water that caught residents off-guard. Multiple small communities were swept away in the ensuing floods.

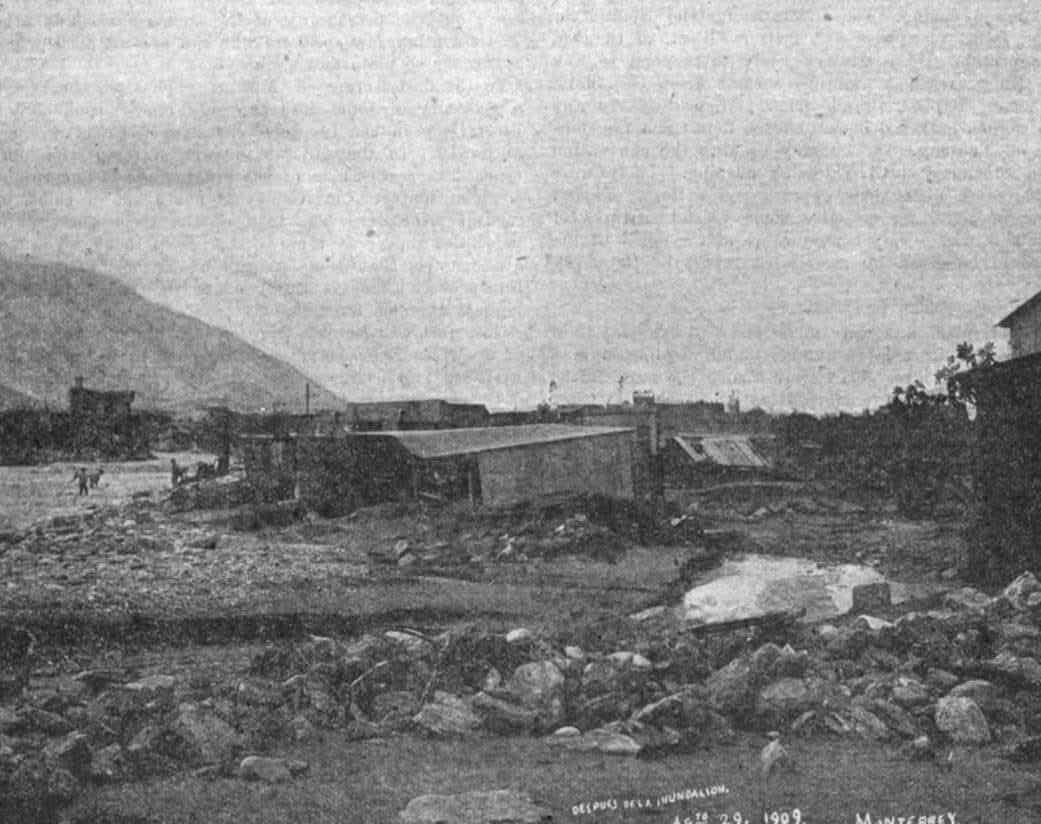
Destroyed buildings in Monterrey after the flood

According to Mexican officials, overnight on August 27, the reservoir dam near Nuevo León's capital city, Monterrey, burst, flooding more than half of the buildings in the city, as well as all of the nearby town of San Luisto. The normally 150 yd (140 m) wide river swelled to 0.75 mi (1.21 km) wide. Steel works and smelters situated along the Santa Catarina River were destroyed after the river rose well over its banks. Hundreds of homes were destroyed throughout the city, leaving an estimated 20,000 people homeless. According to the American Society of Civil Engineers, an enormous 235,000 ft^{3} (6,650 m^{3}) of water was being moved per second during the height of the flood. The raging rivers finally subsided by August 30.

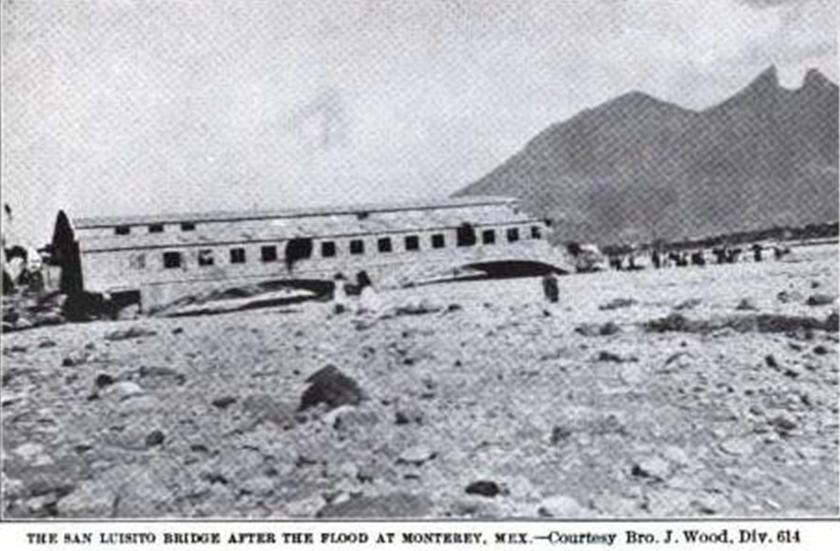
The San Luisito bridge destroyed after the flood

At the height of the floods, residents were forced to seek refuge on the roofs of two-story buildings; however, the Santa Catarina River was flowing at a very fast pace of 20 mph (32 km/h). The force of the current led to most homes being taken off their foundations and sent downstream, resulting in the deaths of anyone inside. In one incident, 90 people died after seeking refuge in a school after their homes collapsed. However, not long after entering the building, flood waters inundated the structure and caused it to collapse. By the morning, survivors reported that the state of the city was "indescribable".

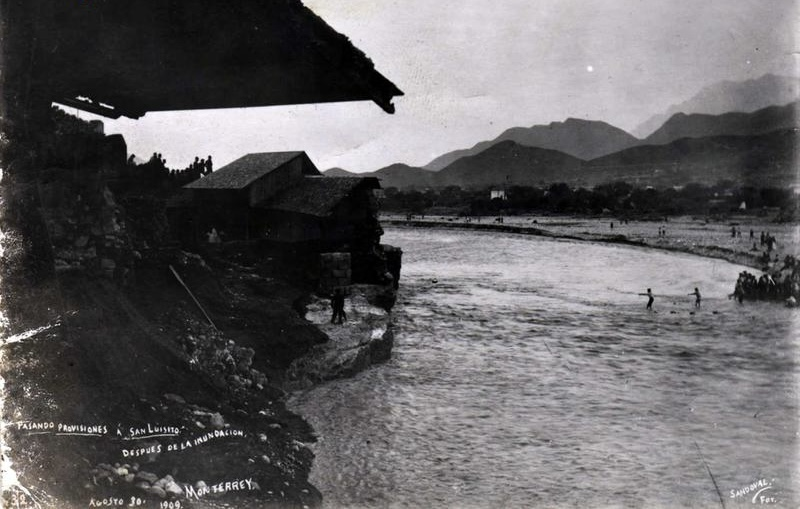
People attempting to rescue civilians in the midst of the flooding in Monterrey

The San Francisco church, built in 1572, was destroyed during the storm. Damage from the hurricane was estimated to have been at least $50 million (1909 USD; $1.79 billion 2026 USD). Of this, roughly $20 million was attributed to railroad losses. Throughout Mexico, reports indicated that about 4,000 people were killed as a result of the storm, making it one of the deadliest Atlantic hurricanes on record. Some estimates place the death toll as high as 5,000 and others as low as 3,000. Of these fatalities, 800 are believed to have been in the south side of Monterrey where four blocks of the city were completely destroyed.

=== United States ===
While the hurricane traversed Cuba on August 24, the United States National Weather Bureau issued hurricane warnings for southern Florida between Tampa and Jupiter and advised ships to avoid the eastern Gulf and South Atlantic. Ahead of the hurricane's landfall in Mexico, the Weather Bureau raised storm and hurricane warnings for the Texas coast on August 27. Upon landfall, the storm's northern half brought increased swells and gusty winds to, recorded up to 68 mph (109 km/h), to parts of southern Texas. Tides were described as the highest in several years. Tarpon Beach was devastated by surging waters, with every structure except the lighthouse and quarantine station being damaged or destroyed.

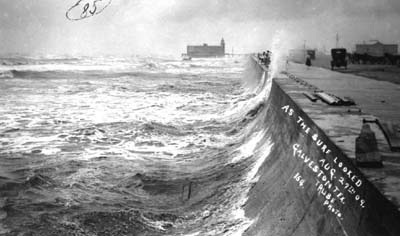
Photo showing waves battering the seawall in Galveston, Texas, from the hurricane on August 27

Debris from the town washed ashore 3 mi (4.8 km) away at Point Island. Rescued personnel from Brazos Santiago were able to save all of the stranded residents as waters rose. The coastlines of Mustang Island and San José Island straddling Aransas Pass were submerged. Low-lying areas north of Corpus Christi were inundated by 1 to 3 ft (0.30 to 0.91 m) of water and several piers were damaged. A tornado near Beeville destroyed a large barn and outhouse. Rainfall from the hurricane reached 7.8 in (200 mm) in Falfurrias between August 27 and 28. Twenty-four-hour rainfall reached 5.88 in (149 mm) in La Parra, a state record for the month of August at the time. Overall damage in the state was minimal from the storm and there were no deaths.

== Aftermath ==
Crippled communication networks and infrastructure hampered relief efforts in the immediate aftermath. More than 60 mi (97 km) of railway was destroyed and numerous roads were washed out. The city of Monterrey was entirely cut-off and within days, food supplies were low and residents were at risk of famine. Local water supplies were rendered useless. Many residents and visitors in the city did all they could to help rescue those trapped in the flood waters and take care of the homeless. According to The New York Times, one person rescued 30 people stranded in flood waters. Numerous rescue operations were undertaken during the flood, saving many lives. However, survivors faced another issue after losing their homes: lack of food. Food was unavailable to most residents in the wake of the storm until August 31 when the first relief supplies arrived. Even then, most only received a small amount of bread and beans. Municipal authorities and the American Consulate provided bread, coffee, and soup to more than 10,000 people. Benefit performances and bull fights were planned to raise charity money. American Consulate General Hanna appealed for American aid on August 30 and the American Red Cross appealed for $20,000.

Once the flood along the Santa Catarina River receded, searches were conducted to attempt to locate the bodies of victims. However, reports indicated that the river bed was similar to quicksand and most bodies on it were likely underground. To deal with the large number of bodies in the wake of the disaster, Mexican officials decided to cremate and mass bury victims. By mid-September, between 1,600 and 1,800 people were hired to repair and rebuild the devastated railways in Nuevo León. In 2009, the third edition of the book El Río Fiera Bramaba: 1909 by Oswaldo Sánchez, re-accounting reports form people who experienced the flood, was planned. According to the director of publications at the Universidad Autónoma de Nuevo León, the book was considered one of historical quality. In memory of those who perished during the flood, the book was released to the public on August 27, 2009, the 100 year anniversary of the disaster.

== See also ==
- List of deadliest Atlantic hurricanes
- Hurricane Alex (2010) - Caused similarly disastrous flooding in Monterrey
- Hurricane Charlie (1951)
- Hurricane Gilbert
