= 1775 Newfoundland hurricane =

Atlantic hurricane in 1775

Meteorological history
- Formed: August 29, 1775
- Dissipated: September 9, 1775

Overall effects
- Fatalities: 4,000<–4,163 + (8th deadliest Atlantic-basin hurricane in recorded history)
- Areas affected: North Carolina, Virginia, Newfoundland
- Part of the 1775 Atlantic hurricane season

The 1775 Newfoundland hurricane, also known as the Independence Hurricane, was a hurricane that struck the Thirteen Colonies and the Colony of Newfoundland in August and September, 1775, at the outset of the American War of Independence. It is believed to have killed at least 4,000 people, making it one of the deadliest Atlantic hurricanes of all time. There is disagreement among historians and meteorologists whether the events were one storm or two distinct storms.

== Impact ==
=== North Carolina and Virginia ===
On August 27, 1775, a hurricane hit the Outer Banks of North Carolina. It turned northeastward and left the state on September 2, bringing heavy wind and rain to southeastern Virginia. A letter from New Bern, North Carolina, recounted, "We had a violent hurricane...which has done a vast deal of damage here, at the Bar, and at Matamuskeet, near 150 lives being lost at the Bar, and 15 in one neighborhood at Matamuskeet."

The September 9, 1775, edition of The Virginia Gazette reported: "The shocking accounts of damage done by the rains last week are numerous: Most of the mill-dams are broke, the corn laid almost level with the ground, and fodder destroyed; many ships and other vessels drove ashore and damaged, at Norfolk, Hampton, and York. In the heavy storm of wind and rain, which came on last Saturday, and continued most part of the night, the Mercury man of war as drove from her station abreast of the town of Norfolk, and stuck flat aground in shoal water."

At least 4,163 people were killed.

=== Newfoundland ===
Deadliest Atlantic hurricanes
| Rank | Hurricane | Season | Fatalities |
|---|---|---|---|
| 1 | ? "Great Hurricane" | 1780 | 22,000–27,501 |
| 2 | 5 Mitch | 1998 | 11,374+ |
| 3 | 2 Fifi | 1974 | 8,210–10,000 |
| 4 | 4 "Galveston" | 1900 | 8,000–12,000 |
| 5 | 4 Flora | 1963 | 7,193 |
| 6 | ? "Pointe-à-Pitre" | 1776 | 6,000+ |
| 7 | 5 "Okeechobee" | 1928 | 4,112+ |
| 8 | ? "Newfoundland" | 1775 | 4,000–4,163 |
| 9 | 3 "Monterrey" | 1909 | 4,000 |
| 10 | 4 "San Ciriaco" | 1899 | 3,855 |

A storm struck the eastern coast of Newfoundland on September 9, 1775. It is uncertain if this storm was the remnants of the hurricane that had crossed the Outer Banks over a week earlier.

Newfoundland's fisheries "received a very severe stroke from the violence of a storm of wind, which almost swept everything before it," Commodore Governor Robert Duff wrote shortly after it struck. "A considerable number of boats, with their crews, have been totally lost, several vessels wrecked on the shores," he said. Ocean levels rose to heights "scarcely ever known before" and caused great devastation, Duff reported.

A total of 4,000 sailors, mostly from England and Ireland, were reported to have been drowned. A localized storm surge is reported to have reached heights of between 20 and 30 feet. Losses from the hurricane include two armed schooners of the Royal Navy, which were on the Grand Banks of Newfoundland to enforce Britain's fishing rights.

The hurricane is Atlantic Canada's first recorded hurricane and Canada's deadliest natural disaster (and by far the deadliest hurricane to ever hit territory of present-day Canada), as well as the eighth-deadliest Atlantic hurricane in history.

== See also ==
- List of Newfoundland hurricanes
- List of Canadian hurricanes
- Great Hurricane of 1780 – The deadliest Atlantic hurricane on record, occurred 5 years later
