= Great Hurricane of 1780 =

Deadly Atlantic hurricane in 1780

The Great Hurricane of 1780
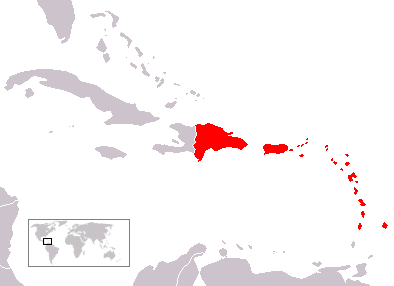
- Areas affected by the hurricane (excluding Bermuda)

Meteorological history
- Formed: October 9, 1780
- Dissipated: October 20, 1780

Unknown-strength storm
- 1-minute sustained (SSHWS/NWS)
- Highest gusts: 200 mph (325 km/h)

Overall effects
- Fatalities: est. 22,000 (Deadliest Atlantic hurricane on record)
- Areas affected: Lesser Antilles, Puerto Rico, Hispaniola, Bermuda, possibly East Florida and some U.S. states
- Part of the 1780 Atlantic hurricane season

The Great Hurricane of 1780 was the deadliest tropical cyclone in the Western Hemisphere. An estimated 22,000 people died throughout the Lesser Antilles when the storm passed through the islands from October 10 to October 16. Specifics on the hurricane's track and strength are unknown, as the official Atlantic hurricane database only goes back to 1851.

The hurricane struck Barbados likely as a Category 5 hurricane, with one estimate of wind gusts as high as 200 mph (320 km/h), before moving past Martinique, Saint Lucia, and Sint Eustatius, and causing thousands of deaths on those islands. Coming in the midst of the American Revolution, the storm caused heavy losses to the British fleet contesting for control of the area, significantly weakening British control over the Atlantic. The hurricane later passed near Puerto Rico and over the eastern portion of Hispaniola, causing heavy damage near the coastlines. It ultimately turned to the northeast and was last observed on October 20 southeast of Atlantic Canada.

The death toll from the Great Hurricane alone exceeds that of many entire decades of Atlantic hurricanes. Estimates are significantly higher than for the 1998 Hurricane Mitch, the second-deadliest Atlantic storm, for which figures are likely more precise. The hurricane was part of the disastrous 1780 Atlantic hurricane season, with two other deadly storms occurring in October.

== Meteorological history ==
This hurricane was first encountered by a boat in the eastern Caribbean Sea, but it may have developed in early October in the eastern Atlantic Ocean off the Cape Verde Islands. The system ultimately strengthened and expanded as it tracked slowly westward; affecting Barbados late on October 9. On October 10, the worst of the hurricane passed over the island, with at least one estimate of gusts as high as 200 mph (320 km/h) during landfall. Early on October 11, the hurricane turned north-northwest about 90 kilometers (56 mi) east of Saint Lucia, and later that night it neared the island of Martinique. The cyclone gradually weakened as it passed to the southwest of Dominica early on October 12 and subsequently struck the island of Guadeloupe.

After hitting Guadeloupe, the hurricane turned west-northwest, passing about 145 km (90 mi) southwest of Saint Kitts. The hurricane steadily neared Puerto Rico as it paralleled the southern coastline, and on October 14 made landfall, to the southwestern-most tip of the island. It subsequently turned to the northwest, going through the Mona Passage before making its approach near the present-day Dominican Republic province of Samaná. Late on October 15, it reached the Atlantic Ocean and after passing about 260 km (160 mi) east of Grand Turk Island; it is estimated to have recurved to the northeast. The hurricane passed 240 km (150 mi) southeast of Bermuda on October 18, and was last observed two days later about 475 km (295 mi) southeast of Cape Race, Newfoundland, Canada.

On October 19, strong winds and high tides were reported in the British province of East Florida (the northeastern portion of present-day Florida). NOAA employees, Christopher W. Landsea and Al Sandrik write that it is possible the hurricane passed much closer to the province than previously thought. Another possibility considered was an extension to a hurricane in the western Caribbean Sea. Because of lack of data, the exact track of the Great Hurricane is unknown.

== Impact ==
Estimates of the death toll from the hurricane range from 22,000 to about 28,500, making it the deadliest hurricane in the recorded history of the Atlantic hurricane basin.

=== British islands ===
About 4,500 people died on Barbados. The hurricane began affecting the island with rain late on October 9. The ships in the bay broke their moorings by 4:00 the afternoon of October 10, and the full impact arrived around 6:00 in the evening. The hurricane produced violent winds "so deafening that people could not hear their own voices."

... a dreadful hurricane which began to rage with great fury at noon [the 10th] and continue with great violence till four o'clock the next morning, the 11th; At eight o'clock at night St. Thomas's parsonage was demolished and the church where the Rector and his family sought shelter began to fall about two hours after, the Chancel fell while the family were in the church ... St. Thomas's Chapel, St. Michael's, St. George's, Christ Church's and St. Lucy's churches were totally destroyed, the other churches were severely 'injured' (except St. Peter's and St. Philip's). Because of the demolition of the parish church and chapel[,] 'divine services' continued in the 'boiling house' at the 'Rock Hall' estate of Thomas Harper by Rev Wm Duke and curate Hugh Austin of St Thomas. Most other buildings and works were blown down and many lives were lost. The dead could not be brought to a church so were buried in gardens and private land.

The hurricane stripped the bark off trees and left none standing on Barbados. Cuban meteorologist José Carlos Millás has estimated that this damage could be caused only by winds exceeding 200 miles per hour (320 km/h). Every house and fort on Barbados was destroyed. According to British Admiral George Brydges Rodney, the winds carried their heavy cannons aloft 100 feet (30 m).

The wind directions recorded during the hurricane suggest that the eye missed Barbados to the north. Northwesterly winds increased through the day on October 10. The wind gradually backed to westerly through the night of October 10 and peaked at midnight. Wind speed returned to normal by 8:00 the morning of October 11.

Strong winds affected Antigua and Saint Kitts, with many ships in Saint Kitts washed ashore. At Grenada, nineteen Dutch ships were wrecked.

The hurricane later grounded 50 ships near Bermuda.

Deadliest Atlantic hurricanes
| Rank | Hurricane | Season | Fatalities |
|---|---|---|---|
| 1 | ? "Great Hurricane" | 1780 | 22,000–27,501 |
| 2 | 5 Mitch | 1998 | 11,374+ |
| 3 | 2 Fifi | 1974 | 8,210–10,000 |
| 4 | 4 "Galveston" | 1900 | 8,000–12,000 |
| 5 | 4 Flora | 1963 | 7,193 |
| 6 | ? "Pointe-à-Pitre" | 1776 | 6,000+ |
| 7 | 5 "Okeechobee" | 1928 | 4,112+ |
| 8 | ? "Newfoundland" | 1775 | 4,000–4,163 |
| 9 | 3 "Monterrey" | 1909 | 4,000 |
| 10 | 4 "San Ciriaco" | 1899 | 3,855 |

=== French islands ===
The hurricane produced a 25-foot (7.6 m) storm surge on Martinique, destroying all houses in Saint-Pierre and causing 9,000 deaths. A storm surge also struck the south coast of Guadeloupe and caused considerable damage.

In Saint Vincent, the hurricane destroyed 584 of the 600 houses in Kingstown.

On Saint Lucia, rough waves and a strong storm tide struck the fleet of Admiral Rodney at Port Castries, with one ship destroying the city's hospital after being lifted on top of it. The hurricane destroyed all but two houses in Port Castries, and about 6,000 perished on the island.

High winds, heavy rains, and storm surge caused severe damage at Roseau in Dominica.

The attorney general of Guadeloupe writes:

The gale of wind which happened on the 12th Oct. was the most severe perhaps ever known. Barbadoes suffered amazingly, 6500 souls perished. Tobago laid waste, Grenades, St. Vincent, St. Lucia, Martinique, suffered more than any person can conceive. St. Kitts and Eustatia, did not escape without damage: this island did but just feel it.

=== Dutch islands ===
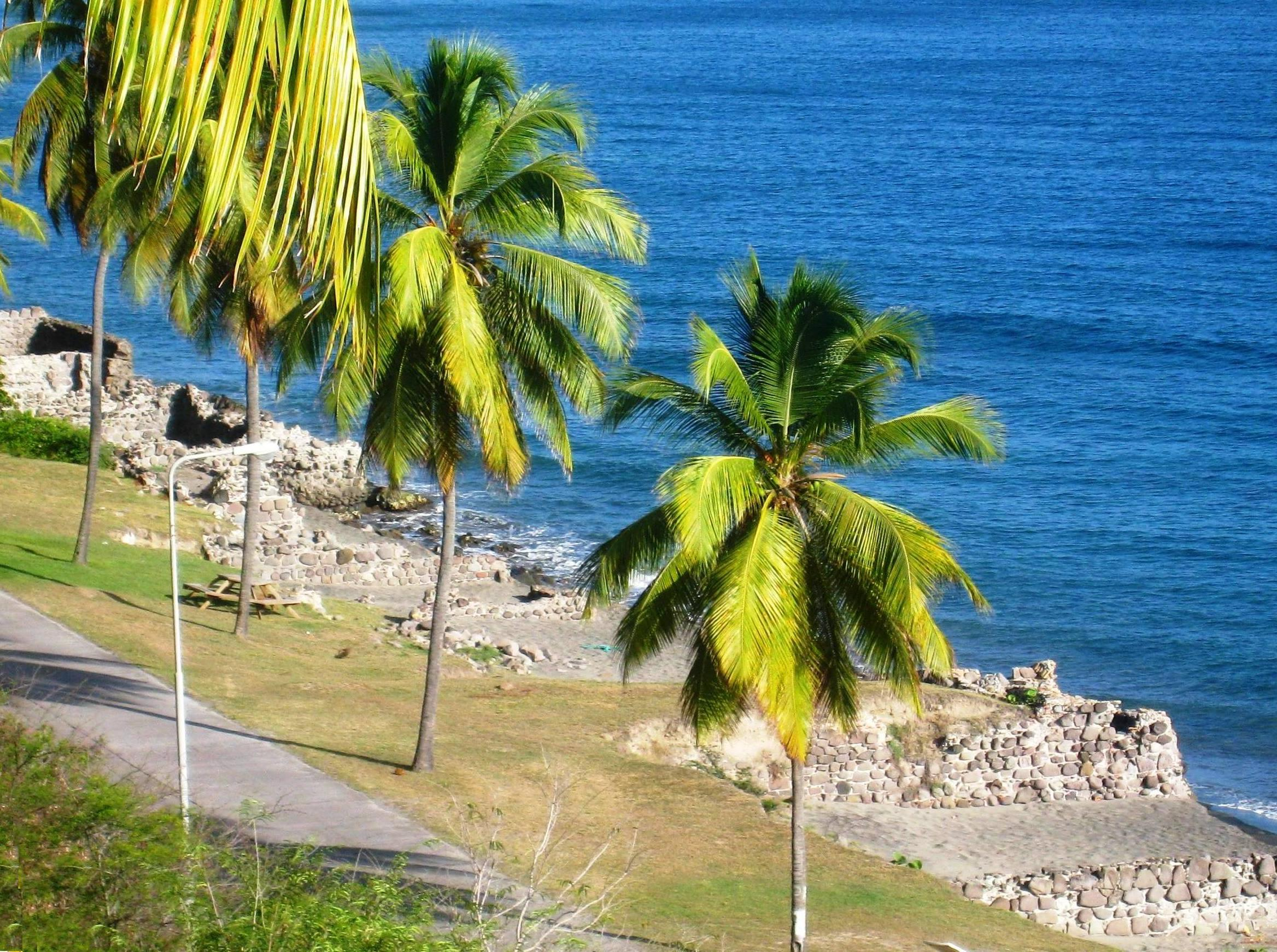
Warehouses on the beach of St. Eustatius were damaged by the hurricane.

A Dutch sea-officer was on a ship that was blown from Sint Eustatius to Martinique. When he returned to Sint Eustatius, he reported on the damage in Saint-Pierre, Martinique, Saint Vincent, and St. Lucia. He writes in his letter:

A short while ago it pleased the Lord Almighty to show us his power. Here we had from 12 to 22 October of this year a very fierce wind & a heavy see that ruined a lot of houses and warehouses, yes even many ships were wrecked and many people were killed. The wall has been completely washed away by the sea and the back of the house has been left only on single struts, yes it was so heavy that the sea flew over our house but we may thank the Lord for his mercy that we have come off so well.

He did not mention a dramatic death toll on the island. He also said that the situation there was not as bad as on the French and English islands.

=== Spanish islands ===
Heavy damage was reported in southern Puerto Rico, primarily in Cabo Rojo and Lajas. Severe damage also occurred in the eastern region of the Captaincy General of Santo Domingo.

=== Losses by the British navy ===
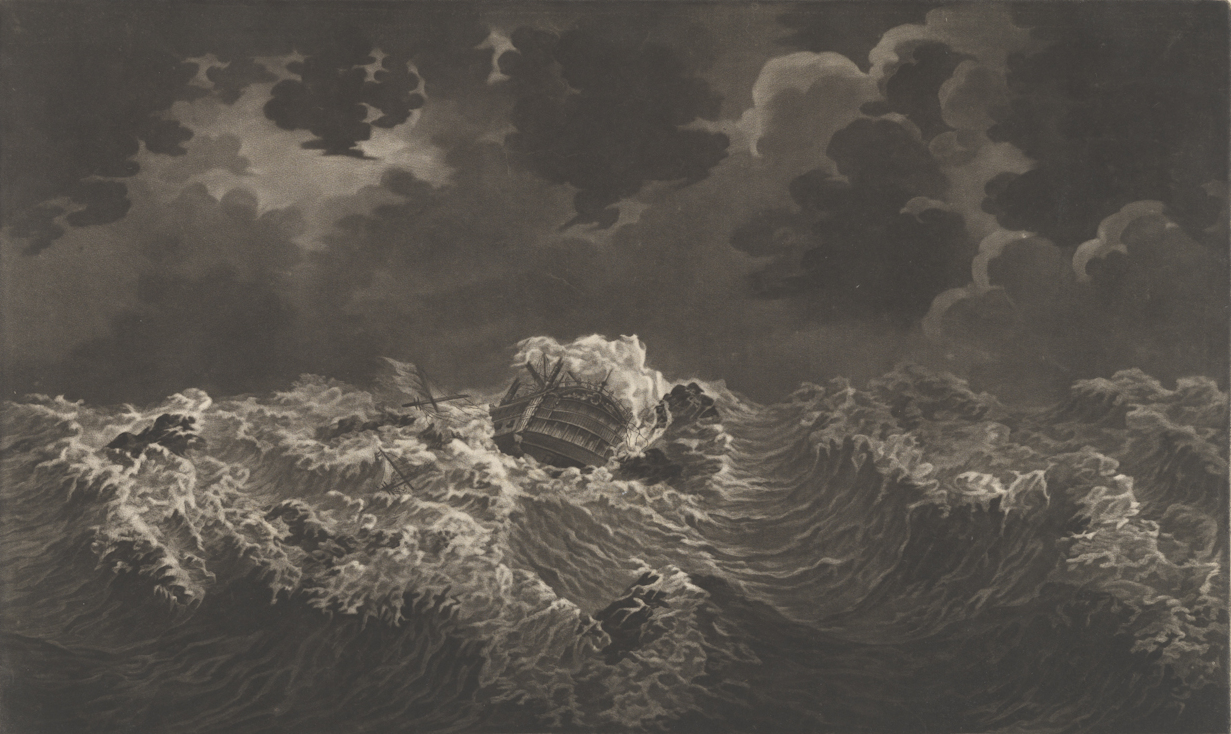
HMS Stirling Castle sinking near Hispaniola

Among the ships lost from Rodney's fleet were the frigates HMS Blanche, which disappeared without a trace, and HMS Andromeda and HMS Laurel, which were wrecked on Martinique with heavy loss of life. By far the worst losses in the Royal Navy, however, were those ships under the command of Vice-Admiral Peter Parker and Rear-Admiral Joshua Rowley. At the time of the hurricane, Rowley was off the coast of New York with a portion of the fleet, including HMS Sandwich, while Parker was in Port Royal, Jamaica. Many of their ships, however, were in the hurricane's path. The ships of the line HMS Thunderer and HMS Stirling Castle, frigate HMS Phoenix, post ship HMS Deal Castle and sloop-of-war HMS Endeavour were lost, and seven other warships were dismasted.

=== Losses by the French navy ===
A fleet of 40 French ships was struck off Martinique during the hurricane. Several hundred military personnel and about 9,000 civilians died; however, the French Navy's only loss was the frigate Junon.

== Name ==
The storm was named the San Calixto hurricane in Puerto Rico because the eye of the cyclone made landfall there on October 14, the Christian feast day of Pope Callixtus I, venerated by the Roman Catholic Church as Saint Callixtus ("San Calixto" in Spanish). Since European arrival in the Americas in 1492, all storms and hurricanes had been named after the name of the saint of the feast day on which the storm hit Puerto Rico; for example, the 1867 San Narciso hurricane, the 1899 San Ciriaco hurricane, the 1928 San Felipe hurricane, and the 1932 San Ciprian hurricane.

It was not until 1953 that the United States Weather Bureau (now the National Weather Service) started naming hurricanes by human names, a practice relinquished in 1979 to the World Meteorological Organization, though it was only in 1960 that hurricanes stopped being officially named after saints in Puerto Rico.

== See also ==
- List of Bermuda hurricanes
- List of deadliest Atlantic hurricanes
- Lists of Atlantic hurricanes
- 1970 Bhola cyclone – Deadliest tropical cyclone of all time
- Hurricane Allen (1980) – Officially has the highest 1-minute sustained wind speeds for an Atlantic hurricane, at 190mph
- Hurricane Irma (2017) – A powerful Category 5 hurricane that affected similar areas
