= List of Atlantic hurricanes in the 18th century =

The List of Atlantic hurricanes in the 18th century encompasses all known Atlantic tropical cyclones from 1700 to 1799. Although not all of the data for every storm that occurred are available, some parts of the coastline were populated enough to provide data of hurricane occurrences.

== 1700–1724 ==
Year	Area(s) affected	Date	Deaths	Damage/notes
1700	Charleston, South Carolina to Virginia	September 13–14 [O.S. September 2–3]	98	Rising-Sun Hurricane of 1700. A hurricane struck the South Carolina coastline while the Rising-Sun, a Scottish warship, was prevented from entering Charleston Bay from the Atlantic by a sandbar across the mouth. It had already been badly damaged by a storm in the Gulf of Mexico, being dismasted, and was seeking repairs. The ship, passengers and crew were returning to Scotland from a failed Scottish attempt to establish a colony at Darien (what we now call Panama). The crew was in the process of 'lightening the ship', to gain entry to the bay, and as part of that, 15 passengers were taken ashore in a small boat. In the ensuing hurricane, the ship was thrust up on the beach, broken up, and all left aboard were drowned. The only survivors from the ship were those who had gone ashore earlier and ended up having to bury the dead on the beach the next day. Ships docked in the harbor at Charleston were also wrecked. Charleston was devastated and flooded by this ferocious hurricane.
1700	Barbados	September 20 [O.S. September 9]		N/A
1702	Barbados	September 24–26 [O.S. September 13–15]		N/A
1703	Virginia, Maryland to New England coastline	October 18–19 [O.S. October 7–8]	N/A	Great wind and flood damage; many ships were lost.
1703	England, British Isles	December 7–8 [O.S. November 26–27]	Many thousands	The Great Storm of 1703. This was the most powerful wind force ever experienced in modern English history, causing more death and destruction than any known storm before or after. One-third of the British Navy fleet sunk during this storm, which likely originated from an Atlantic-based hurricane.
1705	Havana Cuba to southeast coast of Florida	August 16–18 [O.S. August 5–7]	Many were lost	4 ships lost
1706	Barbados to New York to Connecticut	October 5–15 [O.S. September 24-October 4]		Strong wind and heavy rains were reported in NY (14th) and CT (16th). Unusual and heavy flooding occurred in many areas in NY and CT.
1706	Offshore of Virginia coast	November 6–7 [O.S. October 26–27]	N/A	A hurricane at sea - an England-bound fleet of ships from America was scattered by a raging hurricane at sea. Many ships had to return to Virginia for repairs after the hurricane while other ships were lost at sea. No landfall is believed to be known.
1707	St. Kitts and Nevis, Antigua, Montserrat to St. Thomas	September 9–11 [O.S. August 30-September 1]	N/A	Nevis was "nearly ruined" and several ships were wrecked off the coast of St. Kitts.
1707	St. Augustine, Florida	September 30 [O.S. September 19]	N/A	Heavy flooding and damage
1708	Veracruz	N/A	578	N/A
1712	Barbados to Cuba and Jamaica	September 6–10 [O.S. August 26–31]	400	Many houses destroyed
1712	Barbados	September 19 [O.S. September 8]		N/A
1713	Lesser Antilles, Martinique, Guadeloupe to St. Thomas to Puerto Rico	September 4–6 [O.S. August 24–26]	100 in Martinique	San Zacarias Hurricane of 1713. Caused a storm surge in southern Puerto Rico.
1713	North of Antigua to Charleston, South Carolina, North Carolina, Virginia	September 10–17 [O.S. August 31-September 6]	Many	Carolina Hurricane of 1713. Charleston was once again inundated by the sea (see 1700). The death toll was reportedly significant and resulted from the high storm surge that washed in with the storm. On Sullivan's Island, "The new lookout made of wood, built eight square and eighty feet high, was blown down." In Charleston's harbor, all but one of the vessels were driven ashore and "all the front wall and mud parapet before Charlestown [were] undermined and washed away." The two rivers on both sides of the town were connected for a period of unknown time during the storm. The storm was reportedly more violent in the north of Charleston, suggesting that landfall was made north of the town. The effects were most prominent in Currituck County, North Carolina, near the Virginia-North Carolina border, where the storm surge breached the Outer Banks and opened several inlets into the Currituck Sound. William Byrd, one of the commissioners who established the Virginia-North Carolina boundary, stated: "There was no tide in Currituck until 1713 when a violent storm opened a new inlet five miles south of the old one. One of the new inlets carved out by the storm became the location where the Virginia-North Carolina line begins on the Atlantic coast."
1713	Puerto Rico	October 14 [O.S. October 3]		Hurricane San Cándido of 1713. Caused a lot of storm damage in the south coast.
1713	Jamaica to Bermuda	October 24–26 [O.S. October 13–15]		N/A
1714	Florida Keys	Late June	Many drowned	Many ships sank
1714	Guadeloupe	August 13–14 [O.S. August 2–3]		N/A
1714	Barbados to Jamaica	September 5–9 [O.S. August 25–29]		Tropical storm
1715	Bahamas, Florida East Coast	July 31 [O.S. July 20]	1000–2500	Florida Treasure Coast Hurricane of 1715. Occurred near southeastern Bahamas and straits of Florida. Due to numerous delays, the fleet of twelve ships did not depart from Havana, Cuba, until late. Once the heavy-laden treasure ships turned into the Bahamas channel, they encountered northeasterly winds. The hurricane overtook the fleet as it emerged from the Bahamas channel. Three ships sank in deep water; the remainder were driven to the Florida coast wrecked on the rocks and reefs just north of present-day Vero Beach. The fleet captain Spanish Admiral Don Juan de Ubilla drowned in the storm along with more than a thousand other sailors. See 1715 Treasure Fleet and Florida Treasure Coast. The surviving sailors tried to live on the uninhabited Florida coast where their ships had wrecked. After the sinking of the ships, the Spanish government tried to recover some of the treasure, some of which they were able to, though most remains unclaimed to this day. This area off of the Florida coast would be named the "Treasure Coast" for the millions in gold, silver, and jewels these ships from this fleet took down with them from this storm. See List of deadliest Atlantic hurricanes.
1715	Tampico, Mexico	August 26 [O.S. August 15]		Hurricane made landfall in Tampico, Mexico
1715	West of Jamaica to Dauphin Island, Alabama and Mobile, Alabama	October 14–20 [O.S. October 4–10]		Pelican Harbor on Dauphin Island was destroyed by the shifting sands on October 20. Note: Chenoweth and Ludlum list this hurricane in 1715, reference web article in 1717.
1716	Bermuda	August 20 [O.S. August 9]		N/A
1716	Massachusetts, Boston, Martha's Vineyard	October 24–25 [O.S. October 13–14]		The New England Hurricane of 1716 was a hurricane with strong winds and rains affecting Eastern Massachusetts, Boston, and Martha's Vineyard. May have made no direct landfall.
1718	Antigua to Puerto Rico	September 6–7 [O.S. August 26–27]		N/A
1718	Martinique	September 19–21 [O.S. September 8–10]		N/A
1720	North of Puerto Rico to Florida	N/A	500	N/A
1722	Puerto Rico to Jamaica to Carolinas	August 28–September 3	280	Passed south of Port Royal, which was devastated by a 16–18-foot storm surge. 400
1722	Jamaica to Louisiana to South Carolina	September 6–12 [O.S. August 26-September 1]	400	Great Louisiana Hurricane of 1722. Moved through the Lesser Antilles on September 11. This hurricane is the first tropical storm to strike the region for which there are adequate first-hand accounts and almost completely destroyed the city's fragile existing infrastructure. The storm made landfall in Louisiana on September 23 with 15 hours of hurricane winds and an 8-foot storm surge flooding. Hurricane force winds lasted 15 hours. In 1718, 3 feet (0.91 m) high levees protected New Orleans from both river and tidal overflow (today they are 17 feet (5.2 m) high). The buildings in New Orleans suffered extensive destruction, but they were not of high-grade construction; instead, they had been hastily constructed when New Orleans was initially selected to be the capital of the Louisiana Company in 1717-18. The bayou between New Orleans and Biloxi was filled with 2 to 3 feet (0.61 to 0.91 m) of water as a result of the storm, and all ships at the port were destroyed. Rainfall and flooding were reported to have lasted for five days. The French occupied Spanish settlement at Santa Rosa Island, Florida offshore from Pensacola was swept away by storm surge. This storm was responsible for moving Mobile from its old site 27 miles (43 km) north of the mouth of the Mobile River to its present-day site. This same storm likely re-curved northeast and headed into South Carolina as they reported three days of flooding rains in South Carolina around the 27th.
1722	Charleston, South Carolina	September 18–23 [O.S. September 7–12]		Tropical storm
1723	North of Antigua to New York City	August 4–9 [O.S. July 24–29]		N/A
1723	Rhode Island	November 10 [O.S. October 30]		N/A
1724	Virginia, Maryland and Chesapeake Bay	August 23 [O.S. August 12]	N/A	The Great Gust of 1724. Almost all tobacco crops and much of the corn crops were destroyed by this violent tropical storm, which struck the Chesapeake Bay. Violent floods of rain and prodigious gusts of wind were seen upon the James River. Some homes were wrecked, and several vessels were driven ashore. The storm was likely followed by a second hurricane just five days later, which caused rain for many straight days that caused the Virginia floods of 1724.
1724	South Carolina, North Carolina, Virginia, Maryland, Pennsylvania	August 22–30 [O.S. August 11–19]		Second of two hurricanes that passed through the area within five days. Another violent storm system came through affecting Virginia, Maryland, and Pennsylvania with violent winds, flooding, and rain. This system and the Great Gust of 1724 systems are among the most significant tropical storms to affect the Mid-Atlantic during the colonial period of the late 1600s and 1700s.
1724	Hispaniola	September 12	121	Caused the sinking of Nuestra Señora de Guadalupe and El Conde de Tolosa (ship) in Samaná Bay carrying 400 tons of quicksilver from Spain.

== 1725–1749 ==
Year	Area(s) affected	Date	Deaths	Damage/notes
1725	Martinique	September 23–24 [O.S. September 12–13]		N/A
1726	North of Antigua to Bermuda	September 11–19 [O.S. September 1–8]		N/A
1726	Jamaica	November 1–2 [O.S. October 21–22]	18+	This storm devastated Port Royal, sinking some 50 ships. Based on damage information, it was observed to be a small yet powerful hurricane.
1726	Bermuda	No date		N/A
1727	Rhode Island, Connecticut, eastern Massachusetts, Boston	September 27 [O.S. September 16]		The New England Hurricane of 1727 was a strong hurricane that caused considerable damage, uprooted many trees, damaged property, and washed ships in port ashore. Center of the storm likely past over eastern Massachusetts. Severe destruction noted in Essex County.
1728	North Carolina, South Carolina	August 13–14 [O.S. August 2–3]		The Carolina Hurricane of 1728 was the fourth major hurricane to hit Charleston area.
1728	Antigua to Saint Thomas to Hispaniola	August 28-September 2 [O.S. August 17–22]		N/A
1728	North of Leeward Islands to Bermuda	August 31-September 8 [O.S. August 20–29]		N/A
1728	Antigua to west of offshore Bermuda	September 21–30 [O.S. September 10–19]		N/A
1729	Nassau, Bahamas	first week of August		The Woodes Rodgers Hurricane of 1729 was the first report of major storm damage at a settlement in the Bahamas. Dated occurrence three weeks prior to the arrival of the first royal governor of the Bahamas, Woodes Rodgers on August 25, 1729. Storm blew down greatest parts of the houses on the island. The Royal Assembly on the island was not able to conduct business of the colony because of the extensive damage done to the island.
1729	Northern Leeward Islands to Puerto Rico to South Carolina	August 14–19 [O.S. August 3–8]		Hurricane made landfall in Mayagüez, Puerto Rico
1730	Puerto Rico to Jamaica	August 31-September 1	N/A	Hurricane Santa Rosa of 1730 was a storm that passed south of Puerto Rico on August 31 and caused damage to houses and plantations. It made its way to Jamaica on September 1. One ship holding including the ex-president of Panama, was lost at sea during this storm.
1730	Barbados to South Carolina	August 26-September 7 [O.S. August 15–28]		N/A
1730	Havana, Cuba	unknown		This hurricane struck Havana and Matanzas, destroying many buildings.
1730	Jamaica, Cuba	October 15–20 [O.S. October 4–9]		N/A
1730	Caribbean Sea	unknown		Nuestra Senora del Carmen sank in a hurricane south of Jamaica.
1731	Windward Passage	June 24	1+	This hurricane destroyed two ships.
1731	Cayman Islands	September		First recorded tropical cyclone that affected Cayman Islands.
1731	Barbados to Windward Passage to offshore South Carolina	August 24-September 5 [O.S. August 13–26]		N/A
1733	Saint Kitts to Cuba to Bahamas, Florida Keys	July 10–16 [O.S. June 30-July 5]	Several	This hurricane wrecked at least one ship in St.Kitts on July 10 (O.S. June 30). On July 15–16, a 22-ship Spanish treasure fleet was struck by a hurricane as the ships tried to cross the Bahamas Channel. The storm left 13 ships sunk or grounded between Elliott Key and Key Vaca. One of the sunken ships, the Pedro, is located in 20 feet of water off the Indian Key in the Florida Keys. The sinking was one of the greatest maritime disasters. The event was unknown until diver Art McKee began an underwater archival investigation in 1938.
1733	Florida Keys to Alabama	August		N/A
1734	Barbados to Jamaica	September 9–12		Barbados on September 9, Jamaica on September 12.
1735	Cayman Islands	September		N/A
1736	West of Cayman Islands to Pensacola, Florida, Santa Rosa Island, Florida	September 16–19		The Spanish settlement at Santa Rosa Island, Florida was swept away by storm surge.
1737	Antigua, Saint Kitts, Montserrat to Dominican Republic	September 7–10 [O.S. August 28–31]	Several people drowned	This storm destroyed many ships.
1738	Guadeloupe, St. Thomas, Puerto Rico, Dominican Republic	August 28–31 [O.S. August 17–20]	N/A	Hurricane Santa Rosa of 1738 was a hurricane caused damage to agriculture and to many homes in Puerto Rico. It is estimated that it entered Puerto Rico in the east and crossed over the entire island, then passed on to the Dominican Republic.
1738	Puerto Rico	September 12	N/A	Hurricane San Leoncio of 1738 was a hurricane caused damage to agriculture and to many homes on the south side of Puerto Rico. There was no reported damage from San Juan. The hurricane headed to Hispaniola on September 13.
1740	Puerto Rico to Dominican Republic	August 3		Hurricane San Esteban of 1740. This hurricane passed close to the south of the island and then later affected the northeast Dominican Republic. The city of Ponce reported the most damage. This was the first of two hurricanes that impacted Puerto Rico in 1740.
1740	Puerto Rico	September 11–12	N/A	Hurricane San Vicente of 1740 Affected San Juan, Puerto Rico on the northern side of the island. Two ships were destroyed by the hurricane. The hurricane was not strong.
1740	Antigua to Nassau, Bahamas to Mobile, Alabama, Louisiana	September 8–22 [O.S. August 28-September 11]	N/A	Twin Mobile Hurricanes of 1740. On September 22 to 23, a hurricane destroyed the town of La Balize.
1740	Mobile, Alabama	September 29 [O.S. September 18]	N/A	Twin Mobile Hurricanes of 1740.
1741	Santa Rosa Island, Pensacola Florida	Unknown		A hurricane hits northwest Florida Santa Rosa island. Santa Rosa was settled by Spain on November 25, 1722.
1742	Virgin Islands to Puerto Rico to Hispaniola	October 27–31 [O.S. October 14–20]	N/A	Hurricane San Judas Tadeo of 1742 On October 27 to 28, a hurricane passed at some distance on the north side of Puerto Rico affecting St. Thomas. Strong winds caused high seas, which damaged ships. Hispaniola on October 31.
1743	Jamaica to offshore South Carolina coast	September 10 [O.S. August 30]		N/A
1743	Jamaica	October 20	"Great number"	N/A
1743	Jamaica to off U.S. East Coast, Philadelphia, Boston	October 28-November 4 [O.S. October 17–25]		Ben Franklin's 'Eclipse Hurricane'. On November 1 to 2 (O.S. October 21–22), this storm so-called as it occurred during the night of a total lunar eclipse. First tropical storm in American history to be accurately measured with scientific instruments. Ben Franklin noted the difference in the start times the storms that started in Philadelphia and Boston and rationalized that it must have been the same storm traveling northward. This is referred to as the first tangible progress towards understanding the "law of storms". Jamaica on October 28.
1744	Offshore South Carolina	September 8 [O.S. August 29]		N/A
1744	Jamaica to Cuba	October 31-November 1 [O.S. October 20–21]	182	N/A
1745	Windward Passage between Cuba and Haiti	October 16–19 [O.S. October 5–8]		Tropical storm
1746	Barbados to Florida Keys to U.S. Gulf Coast	September 10–14 [O.S. August 31-September 3]		N/A
1746	Caribbean Sea	N/A	N/A	Thirteen ships were destroyed by the storm.
1747	Virginia	September 15	50+	An indentured servant ship was destroyed by the storm.
1747	North Atlantic	September 26–27 [O.S. September 15–16]		N/A
1747	Leeward Islands, Saint Kitts to North Atlantic	September 29-October 6 [O.S. September 18–26]		St. Kitts and Leeward Islands on October 2.
1747	North Carolina to Massachusetts	October 8	"Many"	Seven ships were destroyed by the storm
1747	Bermuda	October 10		The storm was called a "Violent gale of wind"
1747	Jamaica to Nassau, Bahamas to Bermuda	October 13–18 [O.S. October 2–7]		Jamaica on October 13, Bermuda on October 18.
1747	St. Kitts	November 3–6 [O.S. October 23–26]		St. Kitts on November 4. "Upwards of 20 sail of vessels lost"
1748	Off Virginia Capes	September 11		"Dispersed fleet"
1748	Bermuda	October 13		Up to £20,000 damage
1749	Dominica to Gulf of Honduras	September 16–21 [O.S. September 5–10]		Bay of Honduras on September 21
1749	Jamaica to North Carolina, Virginia, Maryland, Delaware	October 14–21 [O.S. October 3–10]		During October 18 to 19, The Coastal Hurricane of 1749 caused severe flooding, high tides, and tree damage. Wind effects were also recorded in New York City, Philadelphia, and Boston. It was estimated to be one of the strongest hurricanes to hit the Mid-Atlantic region. This hurricane produced a huge tidal surge of 15 feet. Responsible for creating Willoughby Spit, a small area of land near Norfolk that was inside the Chesapeake Bay. Ben Franklin had this storm under watch and it helped confirm his hypothesis from the 1743 hurricane he observed that coastal storms moved from the southwest and were preceded by northeasterly winds. Jamaica on October 14.

== 1750–1770 ==
Year	Date	Area(s) affected	Deaths	Damage/notes
1750	August 28–30 [O.S. August 17–19]	Bahamas to Offshore North Carolina, Cape Hatteras	N/A	Bahamas Channel on August 28. Four ships lost off coast of North Carolina
1751	July 24	St. Kitts	Entire crew	One ship lost
1751	July 24 [O.S. July 13]	Havana, Cuba		N/A
1751	August	Cayman Islands	unknown	N/A
1751	September 2	Jamaica	unknown	
1751	September 18–28 [O.S. September 7–17]	Antigua to Jamaica to Florida		Florida on September 28.
1751	October	Jamaica to Havana, Cuba		N/A
1751	October 6–7 [O.S. September 25–26]	Jamaica		Tropical Storm
1752	September 8–16	Saint Kitts to South Carolina		Great Hurricane of 1752 On September 15, was one of the most severe hurricanes to hit the Charlestown area in colonial times. Rated similar to hurricanes that hit the area in 1804 and 1893.
1752	September 23–26	Bahamas to Cuba	N/A	Sixteen ships lost off the north shore of Havana. Struck the Bahamas on the 23rd and Cuba on the 26th. Likely the same hurricane as Second Great Hurricane of 1752 in the Carolinas.
1752	September 26-October 2	Havana, Cuba to South Carolina, North Carolina to Nova Scotia		The Second Hurricane of 1752 On September 30 to October 1, One of the most severe hurricanes to hit the Charlestown area in colonial times. Rated similar to hurricanes that hit the area in 1804 and 1893. Began moving northward up the Carolina coast to Wilmington, North Carolina.
1752	October 22	Offshore Florida, Gulf of Mexico	7+	Over 30 shipwrecks in the Atlantic and Gulf of Mexico attributed to this hurricane. 12 ships lost in Gulf of Florida.
1752	October 28-November 3	Havana, Cuba to Pensacola, Florida, Santa Rosa Island		Cuba on October 28. On November 3, a large hurricane hits northwest Florida at Pensacola and Santa Rosa Island destroying all but 2 buildings and all of the island's dunes and village were washed away. The Spanish settlement is abandoned and moved across the bay to what is now Pensacola.
1753	August 24–25	Cumberland Island, Georgia		Tropical Storm
1754	September 12–26	Lesser Antilles to Santo Domingo to offshore North Carolina		Twelve ships lost off Santo Domingo
1755	October 8	Jamaica		Tropical Storm
1756	September 12–17	Leeward Islands, Martinique to Jamaica		N/A
1756	October 1–3	Cayman Islands to Havana, Cuba		On October 2 to 3, a hurricane with heavy rains struck Havana, Cuba.
1757	August 11	Florida to Boston, Massachusetts		Rain for 3 days; great SW-NW-N gusts
1757	September 22–25	Eastern New England to Nova Scotia		N/A
1758	August 22–24	Barbados and Lesser Antilles		Barbados on August 23
1758	October 17–24	West of Jamaica to Florida to New Jersey coast		N/A
1758	November 10	St. Kitts	200	N/A
1758	N/A	Saint Marks, Florida	40	N/A
1759	September 12–15	Jamaica to Havana, Cuba to Southwest Florida, Florida Keys		A fierce hurricane impeded the Florida Current and that water backed up causing the Dry Tortugas to disappear. Storm surge also washed over every bit of land of the Florida Keys from Key West to Key Largo.
1760	July 6	Charleston, South Carolina		Tropical Storm
1760	August 12	Pensacola, Florida		N/A
1760	September 7–8	Veracruz, Mexico		Hurricane made landfall in Veracruz, Mexico
1760	October 1–6	Jamaica to South Carolina		N/A
1760	October 25	Barbuda	50	N/A
1761	September 20–23	Outer Banks, North Carolina	N/A	A "severe equinoctial storm" made a breach through the Outer Banks of North Carolina, eight miles above its present entrance near Haulover, and it was named New Inlet. This inlet was subsequently closed in 1881, costing $600,000 in that year's dollars.
1761	September 22–23	West of Jamaica		Tropical Storm
1761	October 19–25	Hispaniola to Rhode Island, Connecticut, Massachusetts to Quebec		The Southeastern New England Hurricane of 1761 was a major hurricane that lasted overnight on October 22 to 23. Strong wind damage. Said to be the worst storm in Boston since the great hurricane of 1727. Many buildings were destroyed and bridges washed out from Providence to Newport, Rhode Island and north to Boston and across Cape Cod. Quebec on October 25.
1761	November 9–10	Cartagena, Colombia		N/A
1762	October 4–5	Southwest of Jamaica		Tropical Storm
1762	Santa Rosa Island, Pensacola Florida	Unknown		A hurricane destroys the remaining settlement remnants at Santa Rosa Island.
1763	June 16	West of Jamaica		Tropical Storm
1763	November 5–6	South of Jamaica		Tropical Storm
1763	November 16	Apalachicola, Florida	Unknown	Hurricane struck Spanish garrison in Apalachicola just before midnight on November 16. Storm eye moved ashore. Same hurricane may have sunk Spanish ship Perdido drowning all of the crew near mouth of the now called Perdido River between Florida and Alabama borders
1764	October 2–3	Near West Jamaica		N/A
1764	November 16–20	Apalachee Bay, western Carolinas		N/A
1765	July 30–31	Martinique, Sint Eustatius, Guadeloupe		N/A
1765	August 7–16	Lesser Antilles to Hispaniola to offshore New England coast		Tropical Storm
1765	October 17	South Carolina		N/A
1765	November 13–14	Santo Domingo, Dominican Republic		N/A
1766	July 17	Bahamas		First of many hurricanes produced during the 1766 season. Hurricane passed through the Bahamas Channel.
1766	August 13–16	Martinique to south of Jamaica	440	Martinique on August 13 and Jamaica on August 16
1766	September 1–4	Gulf of Mexico to Galveston, Texas	N/A	The Gulf Hurricane of 1766 On September 4, a strong storm struck Galveston. The next strong storm to hit Galveston wouldn't be until 1818. Five Spanish treasure fleet ships en route from Vera Cruz to Havana were destroyed, but the crew and items were saved. A Spanish mission named Nuestra Senora De la Luz and the Presidio San Augustine de Ahumado on the lower Trinity River was destroyed. Constance Bayou in Louisiana was named after one of the wrecked ships from this storm.
1766	September 8–13	Offshore Virginia coast to west of New York City		Tropical Storm. Off Virginia on September 11 and off New York City on September 13
1766	September 17–24	Saint Kitts, Montserrat to Puerto Rico to Azores	N/A	Hurricane San Genaro of 1766 On September 19, this was a severe hurricane that impacted Puerto Rico. It destroyed half the town and many ships.
1766	October 5–13	Guadeloupe, Martinique to Puerto Rico to offshore South Carolina coast	N/A	Hurricane San Marcos of 1766 passed first across Guadalupe on October 5. There it sank twelve slave ships, killing all aboard. This hurricane also devastated the French-owned Caribbean island Martinique, ruining its sugarcane business there. One of the families affected was that of Joseph Tascher who was financially ruined from the hurricane. Distressed about the well-being of his family following the storm, he sent his daughter Rose Tascher to live in France. Rose later married Napoleon Bonaparte who rechristened his new bride as Josephine. Later it crossed Puerto Rico from south east to north west, it affected the entire island on October 7 to 8.
1766	October 14–24	South of Haiti to Jamaica to Pensacola, Florida	N/A	Florida on October 23. This sunk one ship, killing the entire crew except for three. The tide at St. Marks, Florida rose 12 feet.
1766	October	Texas coast to New Orleans	Unknown	Hurricane went through the Gulf of Mexico and sunk a Spanish treasure fleet off of the coast of Texas, and then curved eastward to New Orleans, Louisiana
1766	October 29-November 1	Havana, Cuba to offshore East of Florida coast		Hurricane made landfall in Havana on October 29
1767	August 5–10	Martinique to Puerto Rico to offshore South Carolina	1,600 drowned	1,600 people drowned on the island of Martinique on August 5 from storm surge. Hurricane San Cayetano of 1767 on Puerto Rico was "[a] powerful hurricane". Caused big flooding and crop damage on August 7. See the list of deadliest Atlantic hurricanes.
1767	September 21–24	Coastal North Carolina, Virginia to southeast Massachusetts	N/A	This hurricane caused a number of vessels to be lost off North Carolina and floods struck Virginia with a mill entirely destroyed in Warwick County during September 21–22. Massachusetts on September 24.
1767	October 13–18	Gulf of Mexico to offshore South Carolina, North Carolina	N/A	N/A
1768	August 8–10	Barbados to Grenada		Barbados on August 8.
1768	October 15	Havana, Cuba	1000	This hurricane destroyed 96 public buildings and 4,048 houses, 69 ships were wrecked. It appeared to pass over the island from west to east. See List of deadliest Atlantic hurricanes.
1769	August 7–9	South of Jamaica		Tropical Storm
1769	September 4–9	North Carolina, Virginia, Maryland, New Jersey to New England coast	At least 6	The Great Chesapeake Bay Hurricane of 1769. It made landfall near New Bern, North Carolina on September 6 and laid that town in ruin as tides rose 12 feet above normal. The eye of the hurricane passed close to Williamsburg. Many old houses in eastern North Carolina and southeastern Virginia were destroyed, particularly around Williamsburg, York, Hampton, and Norfolk due to 13 hours of high winds from the northeast to northwest. Most notably, it caused widespread damage to the Stratford Hall plantation which belonged to the family of the famous Confederate General Robert E. Lee.
1769	September 25–29	Northeast Florida to Charleston, South Carolina	N/A	This hurricane approached Florida and may have hit St. Augustine, Florida on the 25th, but it turned northeastward, and hit near Charleston on the 28th. Damage was minimal in the Carolinas, but crop damage occurred in northeast Florida.
1769	October 29	Florida East Coast		

== 1770s ==
Year	Date	Area(s) affected	Deaths	Damage/notes
1770	June 6	Charleston, South Carolina		Tropical Storm
1770	October 19–20	New England coast, Connecticut to Maine		This hurricane caused strong winds, hail, high tides that caused major flooding. These tides were the highest tides reported since the 1723 area harbor flooding.
1771	May 23–24	Jamaica to Cuba		Tropical Storm
1771	September 30-October 4	Florida Keys to offshore South Carolina		N/A
1771	November 30-December 1	Veracruz, Mexico		Hurricane made landfall in Veracruz, Mexico
1772	August 2–6	Antigua to Hispaniola to Cuba		Landfall at Bayamo, Cuba on August 6
1772	August 27–29	north of Antigua		N/A
1772	August 27-September 4	Greater Antilles including Saint Kitts and Nevis to Puerto Rico to Jamaica to Mobile, Alabama, New Orleans, Louisiana	At least 280	Hurricane San Agustin of 1772 or Bernard Roman's Gulf Coast Hurricane of 1772. This strong hurricane passed through the Leeward Islands on August 27. Nevis was left with very little houses standing after the storm. The hurricane next crossed Puerto Rico on August 28 and damage there to Puerto Rico was severe. The hurricane hit Hispaniola next on August 30 then moving past West Florida and into the Gulf of Mexico making landfall near Mobile, Alabama on September 4. Many ships were destroyed in Alabama. Mobile got severely flooded. At least 280 died from the storm surge and hurricane affects. The storm impact in the Mobile area was detailed in Bernard Romans' book published in 1776. In Pensacola, Florida it destroyed most of the wharves, and drove all the ships at the mouth of Mississippi River into the marshes.
1772	August 29-September 5	Barbados to Antigua, Saint Kitts and Nevis to Saint Croix, St. Thomas to Puerto Rico to west Cuba		Hurricane San Ramón of 1772 or The Alexander Hamilton Hurricane of 1772 The hurricane first impacted Barbados on August 29 and moved next to Antigua and other Leeward Islands on August 30. St. Kitts and Nevis were struck early on August 31. On St. Kitts, the damage was considerable from this hurricane leaving many houses flattened. St. Croix and St. Thomas were impacted later that night on August 31. The eye of the hurricane moved over St. Croix at night between 10pm and 11pm, per Hamilton below. Puerto Rico was hit late on August 31 into September 1, and it was the second hurricane to hit Puerto Rico within three days as the last one struck back on August 28. The northeast side of Puerto Rico has lesser damage than the one a few days before. Alexander Hamilton famously wrote an account on this storm that struck Saint Croix late on August 31, which was later published in the American colonies; community planters in St. Kitts were impressed by his writings, and they raised a fund for Hamilton to receive an education in the colonies, launching him into his service as an American Founding Father. It is also talked about in multiple songs from the hit musical Hamilton.
1772	August 30-September 3	Offshore North Carolina to Cape Henlopen, Delaware	50	14 vessels were forced ashore off North Carolina on September 1.
1772	September 3	Saint Kitts and Nevis	"Several"	Three successive hurricanes hit the island group during the year in 1772. The first on August 27, the second on August 31, and the third on September 3. St. Kitts was impacted twice in three days. This storm was the third one of the three.
1773	June 21	Tobago to Grenada		Tropical Storm
1773	July 20–21	Bahamas to Cuba		N/A
1773	August 26	North Carolina to Virginia	Unknown	This hurricane caused damage to ships in the area.
1773	September 10–19	Tobago to Venezuela, Colombia, to offshore Western Cuba		Venezuela and Columbia on September 13–14. Western Cuba on September 19
1773	September 30-October 2	Virginia	Unknown	It caused three days of rainfall across the region.
1774	August 24–25	Virginia	Unknown	This hurricane was an "August nor'easter" that caused two days of heavy rainfall.
1774	October	Havana, Cuba		N/A
1774	November 1–3	Havana, Cuba to North of Bahamas		Cuba on November 1
1775	July 30-August 1	Martinique to Puerto Rico	Unknown	Tropical Storm San Pedro of 1775 This tropical storm passed close to the southwest corner of Puerto Rico and then over the Dominican Republic on August 1. The effects of this storm are unknown.
1775	August 24-September 3	Barbados to Annapolis, Maryland	Unknown	The Maryland capitol building in Annapolis saw roof damage from a hurricane that began on September 3 and lasted about 24 hours. A "stormy" northeast wind was seen in Westmoreland County, Virginia, along with a "flood of rain."
1775	August 28–29	Havana, Cuba		Hurricane made landfall in Havana, Cuba
1775	August 29-September 9	Outer Banks, North Carolina to Virginia to Newfoundland	4,163	The Newfoundland Hurricane of 1775 or Independence Hurricane of 1775. This was the deadliest known Atlantic hurricane at the time, until it was passed a year later by the Guadeloupe Hurricane of 1776 and the San Calixto Hurricane of 1780. See List of deadliest Atlantic hurricanes. Eighth known deadliest Atlantic hurricane in history. This hurricane moved onshore in North Carolina and traveled up through Virginia, Maryland, and Pennsylvania. It also traveled up through New England. A localized, storm surge is reported to have reached heights of between 20 and 30 feet in Newfoundland, destroying many English and Irish ships. Because of the destruction, many sailors drowned. Over 4,000 people died off of Newfoundland, mainly from storm surge. This storm still is Canada's deadliest natural disaster.
1775	September 12–14	Antigua to Cuba		Tropical Storm
1775	October 16–19	north and central Leeward Islands		Tropical Storm
1775	November 2	Turks and Caicos Islands	11	Hurricane hit the Turks and Caicos islands. Several English warships were lost in the Windward Passage near Caicos islands.
1776	June	South coast of Cuba		N/A
1776	June	New Orleans, Louisiana		N/A
1776	July 10	Virginia	Unknown	Affected a Revolutionary War battle in Virginia; it caused supply ships to sink in the Chesapeake Bay area, and resulted in moderate damage to the area.
1776	August	Offshore northern coast of Cuba		N/A
1776	September 5 to 12	Pointe-à-Pitre, Guadeloupe, Antigua, Martinique to Louisiana	6,000+	The Pointe-à-Pitre Guadeloupe Hurricane of 1776 On Guadeloupe, the hurricane killed over 6,000 people, more than any known hurricane before it. See List of deadliest Atlantic hurricanes. The hurricane hit Martinique on September 5 and hit Pointe-à-Pitre Bay in Guadeloupe the next day killing over 6,000 from storm surge and other causes. Seventh known deadliest Atlantic hurricane in history. An analysis by hurricane scholar Michael Chenoweth indicated that the tropical cyclone was of at least hurricane strength, or with maximum sustained winds of at least 74 mph (119 km/h), when it struck Guadeloupe. The same analysis indicated the storm also affected Antigua and Martinique early in its duration. The storm struck a large convoy of French and Dutch merchant ships, sinking or running aground 60% of the vessels. The ships were transporting goods to Europe. The hurricane made final landfall at Louisiana on September 12.
1777	June	Florida	Several	One ship sunk; no one recovered
1777	August 26	Chesapeake Bay	Unknown	This storm hampered General Howe's march on Philadelphia. It also caused Washington to seek refuge at Hermitage in Elkton, Maryland.
1777	September 10–16	Central Atlantic to Pennsylvania		September 10 - The Ariadne, Ruffel, from Dominica to London sunk, all hands saved. 5 others of the fleet missing. September 16 - Preempted Battle of the Clouds in Chester County, PA.
1777	October 23–31	Saint-Domingue to eastern Oriente Province Cuba		Hurricane made landfall near Santiago de Cuba around October 31.
1777	November 22–23	Western Haiti to offshore southeast of Jamaica		Tropical Storm
1778	June 5	Jamaica		Tropical Storm
1778	August 7–13	Bahamas to North Carolina to New England coastline		Ordering of Providence Hurricane of 1778 Prevented a naval battle between the British and French in the Revolutionary War, causing them to separate as the hurricane moved up the coast.
1778	September 16–17	Jamaica		N/A
1778	August–September	Havana, Cuba		N/A
1778	September 29-October 10	Tobago to Pensacola, Florida and Louisiana		October of 1778 Storm. The Gulf Coast was struck by hurricanes in three successive years during the Revolutionary War. Hurricane hit near Pensacola, Florida on October 9. Sank over 14 British Navy ships and caused extensive destruction to wharves and buildings in Pensacola. The resulting tidal surge from the storm also impacted the Louisiana delta, destroying Belize, Bayou St. John, and Tigouyou.
1778	October 28	Cuba	Several	N/A
1778	November 1	Massachusetts, Cape Cod	50-70	This storm was possibly related to the previous storm
1779	May 25–26	West of Jamaica	N/A	N/A
1779	August 18	Havana, Cuba to Louisiana	Unknown	Dunbar's New Orleans Hurricane. All but one warship in a Spanish fleet were sunk off the coast. Ships in the New Orleans harbor were pushed well inland, causing heavy damage. Many houses in New Orleans were destroyed, many ships were sunk and trees knocked down. William Dunbar, who happened to be in New Orleans at this time, estimated that the center of the hurricane passed directly over New Orleans. Dunbar wrote that nearly half of the houses in New Orleans were either blown down or lost roofs and that every boat on the Mississippi river had disappeared from the storm. From this hurricane experience in 1779, Dunbar first uncovered the true nature of tropical storms and hurricanes that a hurricane revolves around a vortex in the center and had progressive forward movement. He presented his findings to the American Philosophical Society in 1801.
1779	August 28-September 3	Martinique to offshore South Carolina	"Many"	Martinique on August 3
1779	December 3	Atlantic coast	120	N/A

== 1780s ==
The 1780 Atlantic hurricane season was extraordinarily destructive and was the deadliest Atlantic hurricane season in recorded history with over 25,000 deaths. Four different hurricanes, three in October and one in June, caused at least 1,000 deaths each; this event has never been repeated and only in the 1893 and 2005 seasons were there two such hurricanes. The season also held the deadliest Atlantic tropical cyclone of all time.

Additionally, 1780 was a turning point in Caribbean habitation and trade, marking the end of a long period of economic boom that started in the early 1500s and marked the beginning of an economic decline for the region as news of the devastating hurricanes spread. Eight different storms battered the West Indies including three killer storms in the month of October alone. Tens of thousands were killed across the Caribbean onshore from storm surge, powerful winds and many thousands more killed offshore on sunken ships. The hurricanes struck the Caribbean in the midst of the American Revolutionary War as British and French navies were vying for control over the region and the hurricanes did considerable damage to both fleets wrecking numerous ships and drowning many.

Year	Date	Area(s) affected	Deaths	Damage/notes
1780	June 13	Saint Lucia to Puerto Rico to Dominican Republic	4000-5000	San Antonio Hurricane of 1780 or The St. Lucia Hurricane of 1780. The hurricane first struck St. Lucia where it killed between 4,000 and 5,000. The hurricane moved on to Puerto Rico on June 13 where it "caused deaths and losses". It moved on next to the Dominican Republic. See List of deadliest Atlantic hurricanes.
1780	August 24	Louisiana	25	The Louisiana Hurricane of 1780 New Orleans experienced a powerful hurricane on August 24, with winds gusting over 160 mph, completely destroying 39 of the 43 buildings in Grand Isle, Louisiana. Then, the eye passed over New Orleans that night, severely damaging structures in what is now known as the French Quarter, causing harvest-ruining crop damage, severe flooding, and tornadoes.
1780	August 25	Saint Kitts		Tropical storm or hurricane
1780	October 1–8	Montego Bay, Jamaica to Cuba to Bahamas	3,000	The Savanna-la-Mar Hurricane of 1780 Early on, it sank the British transport ship Monarch, killing several hundred Spanish prisoners and the ship's entire crew. The hurricane began to move northwest towards Jamaica, where it destroyed the port and settlement of Savanna-la-Mar on October 3. As many of the town's residents gathered at the coast to see the large waves coming in, a 20-foot surge came in engulfed the onlookers, docked ships, and many of the town's buildings. In the nearby port village of Lucea, 400 people and all but two structures perished, with 360 people also killed in the nearby town of Montego Bay. It would go on to sink the British frigate Phoenix (killing 200 of its crew), the Monarch with its crew and several hundred Spanish prisoners onboard, and ships-of-the-line Victor, Barbadoes, and Scarborough and crippled many others. It continued its direction, and hit Cuba on October 4, followed by a pass over the Bahamas. See List of deadliest Atlantic hurricanes.
1780	October 10–20	Barbados to Lesser Antilles, Sint Eustatius, Martinique to Puerto Rico, to Eastern Hispaniola to offshore east of Bermuda	20,000 - 27,500	Great Hurricane of 1780, San Calixto Hurricane of 1780, or Great Hurricane of the Antilles. This is the deadliest known hurricane on record in the Atlantic. The record still stands today. It killed over 20,000 people and estimates as high as 27,500 people including 4,326 people in Barbados, 4,000-5,000 people on St. Eustatius, 9,000 people on Martinique, and 1,000 people in St. Pierre which had all of its homes destroyed, Many of the deaths were due to the storm surge drowning. See List of deadliest Atlantic hurricanes. On October 10, the hurricane destroyed the island of Barbados with winds possibly exceeding 320 km/h (200 mph) which would make it an extreme category 5 strength hurricane, leaving the island completely decimated with nearly all its buildings and plantations destroyed. The town of Bridgetown in Barbados was completely destroyed. The force of the winds was so intense that most of the island's trees were knocked down and the ones that remained standing had their bark stripped off. It also severely affected St. Vincent and Grenada. The hurricane then moved to Saint Lucia, Martinique, and St. Eustatius. Coming in the midst of the American Revolution, the storm caused heavy losses to British and French fleets in conflict in the area. The hurricane later passed near Puerto Rico and over the eastern portion of Hispaniola. There, it caused heavy damage near the coastlines and then sank 50 ships in Bermuda. It ultimately turned to the northeast without striking the United States.
1780	October 15–26	Havana, Cuba to Gulf of Mexico to Pensacola, Florida	2000+	Solano's Hurricane A powerful hurricane in the Eastern Gulf of Mexico struck a Spanish war fleet of 64 vessels under José Solano en route from Havana, Cuba to attack Pensacola, Florida, then the capital of British West Florida. The ships had 4,000 men aboard under the military command of Bernardo de Gálvez, and 2,000 died. The slow-moving hurricane was first noted near Jamaica on October 15. Progressing northwestwards, it likely crossed the western end of Cuba near Havana on October 17, before shifting northeast-wards towards Apalachee Bay. It struck Solano's fleet in the Gulf of Mexico on October 20. The hurricane made landfall near Pensacola, Florida around October 21. See List of deadliest Atlantic hurricanes.
1780	October 23	Barbados to Saint Lucia		Lesser Antilles Hurricane
1780	November 17	New England		A tropical cyclone moved up the east coast of the United States, disrupting the British blockade of the New England states.
1781	August 1–2	Jamaica	N/A	Many ships washed ashore
1781	August 9–11	South Carolina, North Carolina	N/A	The Occupation of Charleston Storm
1781	August 16–23	West of Jamaica to New Orleans	N/A	New Orleans on August 23
1781	September 3–7	Saint Lucia to southwest of Jamaica	N/A	Tropical Storm
1781	November 2–3	West of Jamaica	N/A	Tropical Storm
1781	Unknown	Offshore Florida	2000	See List of deadliest Atlantic hurricanes.
1782	June 30	Southwest of Western Jamaica	N/A	Tropical Storm
1782	July	Havana, Cuba		N/A
1782	August 15	Straits of Florida		N/A
1782	September 16	Central Atlantic	3,000	The Central Atlantic hurricane of 1782 was a hurricane that hit the fleet of Admiral Thomas Graves as it sailed across the North Atlantic in September 1782. It is believed to have killed some 3,000 people. See List of deadliest Atlantic hurricanes.
1783	September 15–20	Off U.S. East Coast, North Carolina, South Carolina	N/A	3 ships sunk off North Carolina on September 19
1783	October 5–9	West of Jamaica to South Carolina, North Carolina, Virginia	N/A	The Charleston Hurricane of 1783 Charleston saw excessive rain and wind with the cyclone on October 7. Strongest reported tropical storm in Charleston since 1752. Winds shifted from northwest to northeast as the storm passed offshore. Extensive damage was also seen in North Carolina. Richmond saw violent northeast gusts for 24 hours, but no damage. Norfolk and Portsmouth reported a "25-foot tide" which caused damage.
1783	October 18–19	New Jersey to Rhode Island, Connecticut		Heavy rains and winds in New Brunswick, NJ and New Haven, CT. Brought snowfall to western Connecticut and Vermont.
1784	June	Florida Straits		N/A
1784	July 10–17	Grenada to Curaçao to Honduras		Many ships damaged or destroyed in Curaçao.
1784	July 27-August 5	Dominica to Jamaica to Pensacola, Florida	9	Hurricane at Jamaica on July 30. "Captain [Paul] Cox got in here from St. Ann's the 30th ult[ima] but a few hours before a most violent hurricane came on, which began about 8 at night, and at nine the brig parted her cables and was drove on shore. Captain Rice, in a brig from Salem, and a ship belonging to Bristol, are also on shore. The ship Britannia, of between 4 and 500 tons rode it out—In consequence of the calamity occasioned by this hurricane, it is expected the ports of this island will be opened for six months. Captain Rice, with six of his people, taking to their boat, were lost. It is said, he had between 4 and 5000 dollars with him. Scarce a vessel in the harbour of Kingston but was either lost or drove on shore. St. Thomas's in the east has received the greatest damage. Scare a house or plantation but has suffered. Captain Gray in a brig belonging to Salem, lay at Morant Bay, have heard nothing from him in particular; but the report is, that every vessel that lay there, except one ship, is either lost or drove on shore. No perfect account of the damage is yet come to hand." Hurricane at Pensacola, Florida on August 5.
1785	August 23–31	Saint Croix to Puerto Rico to Cuba, Jamaica and Cayman Islands to Belize	142	An eastward moving hurricane struck St. Croix on August 24. It next moved on to Puerto Rico, Cuba and Jamaica. There was heavy damaged sustained in Havana, Cuba. 4 ships sunk in harbor. Caused 142 deaths. Also the first Cayman Islands tropical cyclone that is recorded in detail.
1785	September 1	Delaware	181	One of the few hurricanes on record in the state. It wrecked the ship Faithful Steward.
1785	September 10	Charleston, South Carolina		Tropical Storm
1785	September 23–24	Mid-Atlantic states	N/A	The Equinoctial Storm. Impacted the coastline shortly after the Sept 23 equinox. Led to the "highest tide ever before known in Norfolk." It struck the lower Chesapeake Bay. Portsmouth experienced a strong northeast to northwest gale for 3 days. The storm in Virginia was noted in both the Virginia Gazette of October 1 and the New Jersey Gazette of October 1 (from Ludlum 1963 p. 30). The Annual Register the next year reported that several ships had been driven ashore by the tide and the wind, with a total damage estimated at around £30,000. The two parallel track storms of 1785 led to the building of the lighthouse in Cape Henry which opened seven years later in 1792.
1785	September 25	Puerto Rico	N/A	San Lupo Hurricane of 1785 devastated agricultural fields. Governor Juan Dabán visited the island's affected area to inspect and help with the damages; it was the first time a governor of Puerto Rico did that after a hurricane.
1786	June 5	Western Jamaica		Tropical Storm
1786	August 29	Offshore U.S. East Coast, North Carolina		North Carolina per Ludlum
1786	September 2–10	Barbados to Nassau, Bahamas to offshore South Carolina	"Several"	Several houses destroyed in Barbados on September 2
1786	September 28	Charleston, South Carolina		Tropical Storm
1786	October 5	Eastern Virginia	N/A	Heavy rainfall accompanied the storm. According to George Washington, tides were "occasionally high" at Mount Vernon, with "high freshes." James Madison at Montpelier saw the Rapidan River overflow its banks. The center may have passed very near his location, as the winds shifted from southeast to southwest.
1786	October 19–23	Jamaica to Havana, Cuba to Bahamas	7	N/A
1787	August 2–7	Dominica to Turks and Caicos Islands		Tropical Storm
1787	August 6–11	Grenada to Jamaica to Bahamas		Tropical Storm
1787	August 15–16	Southern tip of Florida		N/A
1787	August 23–28	Leeward Islands to Bahamas to South Carolina		N/A
1787	August 29-September 4	Dominica to Belize to Veracruz, Mexico	100	A hurricane struck Dominica on August 29 and then Belize around September 2. It has been identified as 'Event 6' in Belizean sedimentary records by McCloskey and Keller. Two articles in the Georgia State Gazette or Independent Register (Augusta, GA) provide a vivid and detailed description of the storm in Belize, with estimates of more than 100 casualties and more than 500 houses destroyed. Several injuries were caused by this hurricane in Veracruz.
1787	September 16 (19)	Georgia to South Carolina	23	A storm moved just offshore the Georgia and South Carolina coastline to lead to a storm surge that caused 23 people to perish, as well as flooding and crop damage between Savannah and Georgetown. Ludlum/Redfield date this storm as September 19, Chenoweth updated to September 16.
1787	September 23	Honduras	100	N/A
1787	October 24	Saint Croix, Tortola, Virgin Islands	N/A	"Savannah, November 22. By Captain McLean, who arrived here on Saturday last from the Windward Islands, we have advice, that a hurricane happened there on the 24th of last month; he was then off St. Eustatia, and afterwards went into the Danish Island of St. John, where he learnt that all the shipping at St. Croix were driven ashore, except one brig that foundered at her anchors; that a great many houses and other buildings were thrown down, and numbers of lives lost; and that the sugar canes had suffered much. He also heard that the hurricane had done considerable damage at Tortola, and thinks it must have been severely felt at St. Christopher's."
1788	June 4	Western Jamaica		Tropical Storm
1788	July 22–24	Mid-Atlantic States	N/A	George Washington's Hurricane. George Washington reported from Mount Vernon a "very high northeast wind" the previous night, which sank ships and blew down trees. A "more violent and severe a hurricane than for many years." Madison at Montpelier reports a "great wind and rain." According to the Philadelphia Independent Gazette on August 8, the storm in Norfolk began from the northeast at 5 p.m. on the 23rd, then blew a "perfect hurricane" from the south at 12:30 a.m. The tide was lower than in 1785. Alexandria also saw the winds switch from east-northeast to south, which caused the highest known tide in the Potomac.
1788	July	Mississippi	N/A	Landfalling hurricane in Mississippi caused the Mississippi river to flood in July 1788.
1788	August 14–19	Martinique, Dominica to Puerto Rico to Bahamas to New England	600-700	Hurricane San Roque of 1788. Martinique was hit by a hurricane on August 14. It moved on to Dominica, and then to Puerto Rico on August 16. The storm curved northward to the Bahamas and moved further northward to end up in New England on August 19. The hurricane caused 600-700 reported deaths. Additional details given in an article on pages 2 and 3 of The Georgia State Gazette, or Independent Register. (Augusta, GA), November 8, 1788.
1788	September 8–9	Jamaica		Tropical Storm
1788	September 19–23	U.S. East Coast to Newfoundland, Canada		Newfoundland September 23. Tropical Storm
1788	September 29-October 6	South of Jamaica to Cayman Islands to South Carolina		South Carolina on October 6. Tropical Storm
1789	August 17–18	New Orleans		Hurricane made landfall near New Orleans, Louisiana
1789	August 19	New Jersey to New England	N/A	Heavy damage

== 1790s ==
Year	Date	Location	Deaths	Damage/notes
1790	August 10–12	Tobago to Curacao		N/A
1790	August 29-September 2	Barbados to Jamaica		N/A
1791	June 18–23	Cuba to Florida Panhandle	3,000	The Great Cuba Hurricane of 1791. During June 21–22, a powerful storm impacted Havana killing at least 3,000 people and 11,700 cattle perished on the island, mainly due to storm surge. See List of deadliest Atlantic hurricanes.
1791	September 27-October 4	Jamaica to Bahamas		N/A
1791	October 25	Saint Croix, near Puerto Rico		Hurricane affected St. Croix and offshore near Puerto Rico on October 25
1791	Unknown	Southern Texas	N/A	This storm flooded Padre Island and the mainland nearby. A herd of 50,000 cattle belonging to a Spanish cattle baron drowned in the storm surge.
1792	July 14	Sint Eustatius, Saint Kitts		Tropical storm
1792	August 1–12	Lesser Antilles to Caicos island	N/A	Several ships were destroyed in Lesser Antilles.
1792	October 29–31	Havana, Cuba to South Carolina		Cuba on October 29. South Carolina on October 31.
1793	August 13	Virgin Islands	28	This hurricane moved slowly through the area.
1793	August 12–18	Leeward Islands to Bahamas to Louisiana	N/A	This hurricane made landfall and caused crop damage and minor flooding in Louisiana on August 18.
1793	October 21–23	Jamaica, Cayman Islands to Bermuda	unknown	Likely devastated Cayman Islands, as there are records that states population was still struggling to recover in February 1794.
1794	May 28	West of Jamaica	N/A	Tropical storm
1794	June 27	Jamaica	N/A	One ship was destroyed in this tropical storm.
1794	July 4	Mid-Atlantic states	N/A	Reported at Annapolis by William Faris in his diary. On the night of the 5th, it "raind and Blowd very Hard" (sic) all night. It finally cleared out between 10 and 11 am on the 6th.
1794	Late July	Jamaica	"Heavy deaths"	N/A
1794	August 9–10	Havana, Cuba		Hurricane made landfall near Havana, Cuba
1794	August 10–11	Louisiana, New Orleans		Hurricane made landfall in Louisiana. Affected Baton Rouge and New Orleans around August 10 and 11.
1794	August 25–September 1	Havana, Cuba to Louisiana	100+	Hurricane struck Havana on August 25. 100 bodies were recovered in the harbor the day after. It also struck Florida Keys and the crew of the vessel Vigilant stayed on their damaged ship for two days. On August 31, in Louisiana, heavy flooding, high winds, crop damage, and unusually large hail occurred.
1794	Early October	Northeastern Florida	N/A	Caused beach erosion and damage
1794	October 26	Mid-Atlantic states	N/A	Caused 3.5 inches (89 mm) of rain at Madison's Montpelier estate. While the wind there was "brisk" on the morning on the 26th, Annapolis reported that "it Blow'd very Hard a near Hurrican [sic] and rained all night" from the 26th into the 27th.
1795	July 20	Louisiana, New Orleans		Hurricane made landfall near mouth of the Mississippi River in Louisiana.
1795	July 27-August 3	Leeward Islands to North Carolina, Virginia		Twin North Carolina Hurricanes of 1795. North Carolina and Virginia on August 2–3. First of two parallel track hurricanes that occurred ten days apart. Several Spanish ships lost; brought heavy rain through the mid-Atlantic, disrupting mail service and damaging crops; at Annapolis, rain set it on the afternoon of the 2nd, before it escalated later in the day, when it "Blow'd a Harrican." Trees were levelled and the tide was so high that "one could not get to the Market House without a Boat." Vessels were driven ashore by the tempest (from the diary of William Faris). Thomas Jefferson recorded this hurricane in his journal as his plantation at Monticello suffered heavy crop losses.
1795	August 2–13	North of Puerto Rico to North of Hispaniola to North Carolina, Virginia		Twin North Carolina Hurricanes of 1795. North Carolina and Virginia on August 12–13. Considered a major hurricane, caused additional flooding and crop damage after the previous storm; the damage could be "Modestly estimated at a year's rent", quoted by Thomas Jefferson. The "powerful torrent" of rain in Petersburg caused creeks to rise higher than noted in the previous 70 years (North Carolina Journal). Winds were gusty at Farmville, where a "great fresh" was reported. Annapolis reported strong winds and rains on August 13 as well. Thomas Jefferson recorded this hurricane in his journal as his plantation at Monticello suffered heavy crop losses. The two storms caused the Appomattox river to crest more than 12 feet above flood stage.
1795	August 18–21	Leeward Islands to Turks and Caicos Islands		N/A
1795	October 10	South Carolina		Tropical Storm
1796	August 25–27	Straits of Florida to New Orleans		Hurricane made landfall in Louisiana. Affected New Orleans on August 26 and 27.
1796	Early September	Havana, Cuba to Bahamas to Florida coast		Bahamian wreckers reported this severe gale off the coast of Florida. The Bahamas were also struck by this hurricane.
1796	October 2–4	Pinar del Río, Cuba to Bahamas	N/A	This hurricane caused shipping delays.
1797	September 5	North Carolina	N/A	One ship sunk
1797	October 17–21	Bahamas to South Carolina	"Many"	The Charleston Hurricane of 1797 Charleston saw excessive rain and wind with the cyclone. Strongest reported tropical storm in Charleston since 1783 and 1752 ones. Several ships lost.
1799	June 2–9	Central Cuba to U.S. Coast		Cuba on June 2.
1799	September 17	St. George Island, Florida, Apalachicola, Florida		Hurricane sank HMS Fox off St. George Island near what is now known as Fox point. The storm lasted for 3 days and covered island in 2 feet of water. William Augustus Bowles was on the ship and survived the hurricane on the island. Bowles went on to create the State of Muskogee in Florida in 1799.
1799	September 23	Jamaica	27	This hurricane remained offshore, but rain, flooding, and winds were severe
1799	September 25	Charleston, South Carolina		Tropical storm
1799	October	Oriente, Cuba		N/A

== See also ==
- Lists of Atlantic hurricanes
- Atlantic hurricane season
