= 1780 Atlantic hurricane season =

Seasonal boundaries
- First system formed: ≤June 13, 1780
- Last system dissipated: ≥Nov. 17, 1780

Strongest storm
- Name: "Great Hurricane"
  - Maximum winds: 200 mph (325 km/h)

Seasonal statistics
- Total storms: ≥ 8
- Hurricanes: 7
- Major hurricanes (Cat. 3+): ≥ 4
- Total fatalities: ≥ 28,000 (Deadliest Atlantic hurricane season on record)
- Total damage: Unknown

The 1780 Atlantic hurricane season was an extraordinarily deadly and devastating Atlantic hurricane season, which became the deadliest Atlantic hurricane season in recorded history, with over 28,000 deaths. The season ran through the summer and fall in 1780. Four different hurricanes, one in June and three in October, caused at least 1,000 deaths each; this event has never been repeated, and only in the 1893 and 2005 seasons were there two such hurricanes. The season also had the deadliest Atlantic hurricane of all time, the Great Hurricane of 1780. Only one of the known storms was not a hurricane.

Landfalling storms affected the Lesser Antilles, Puerto Rico, the Dominican Republic, Jamaica, Cuba, Bermuda, Louisiana, Georgia, Florida, and the New England states.

== Context ==
This destructive season should be seen against a backdrop of the American Revolution, which involved hostilities in the Caribbean by the fleets of Spain, France and the Dutch Republic operating against British fleets with the concomitant greater risk of loss of life due to increased exposure of warships and transports to hazardous weather conditions. This critical coincidence is at least partially responsible for the unprecedented losses of life inflicted, especially in the three fierce hurricanes that struck in quick succession during October.

== Systems ==
=== San Antonio Hurricane ===
The San Antonio Hurricane, also known as the St. Lucia Hurricane first struck St. Lucia where it killed between 4,000 and 5,000 people. The hurricane then passed near or over Puerto Rico on June 13, where it "caused deaths and losses". It was last reported in the Dominican Republic where it affected crops, properties, and caused a lot of damage. See List of deadliest Atlantic hurricanes.

=== Louisiana Hurricane ===
New Orleans was struck by a powerful hurricane on August 24, experiencing winds gusting over 160 mph (260 km/h). The hurricane destroyed 39 of the 43 buildings on Grand Isle, Louisiana. The eye then passed over New Orleans and severely damaged structures in what is now known as the French Quarter. The hurricane also caused widespread crop damage, severe flooding, and tornadoes across southeast Louisiana. It is believed that the hurricane killed around 25 people.

=== St. Kitts Tropical Storm ===
On August 25, St. Kitts in the Leeward Islands was struck by a storm causing a brief amount of rainfall.

=== Savanna-la-Mar Hurricane ===
A strong storm formed in the southern Caribbean Sea on October 1. Shortly after, it sank the British transport ship Monarch with all hands, including several hundred Spanish prisoners. The hurricane began to move northwest towards Jamaica, where it destroyed the port of Savanna-la-Mar on October 3. Many of the town's residents gathered at the coast to watch, but the 20 foot storm surge engulfed the onlookers in addition to the docked ships and many of the town's buildings. In the nearby port village of Lucea, 400 people perished and all but two structures were destroyed; 360 people were killed in the nearby town of Montego Bay. The hurricane would subsequently sink the British frigate HMS Phoenix, killing 20 of her crew; the sloops HMS Victor and HMS Barbadoes and post ship HMS Scarborough also foundered during the hurricane. It continued its direction, and made landfall in Cuba on October 4, followed by a pass over the Bahamas. The storm is believed to have caused 3,000 deaths.

=== Great Hurricane of 1780 ===
The second hurricane of October 1780 formed on October 9. It is still referred to as "The Great Hurricane" or "Great Hurricane of the Antilles" in some places, but its official name is "San Calixto Hurricane." The hurricane devastated the island of Barbados on October 10 with an estimate of 200 mph (325 km/h) wind gusts, killing 4,300 and creating an economic depression. St. Vincent suffered a 20-foot (6 meter) storm surge. The storm went on to kill 6,000 people on the island of St. Lucia and 9,000 on Martinique, with its capital city, St. Pierre, becoming almost completely demolished. It later moved northwestward toward the island of St. Eustatius, killing 4,000 to 5,000 and devastating Puerto Rico, Dominique, and Bermuda. In total, the hurricane caused a record 22,000 deaths in the eastern Caribbean Sea and rates as the all-time deadliest hurricane in the Atlantic. The high number of fatalities is due in part to "the presence of the powerful fleets of Britain and France, both maneuvering on nearby islands to strike blows at each other's rich possessions in the Antilles." The storm dissipated on or after October 18.

=== Solano's Hurricane ===
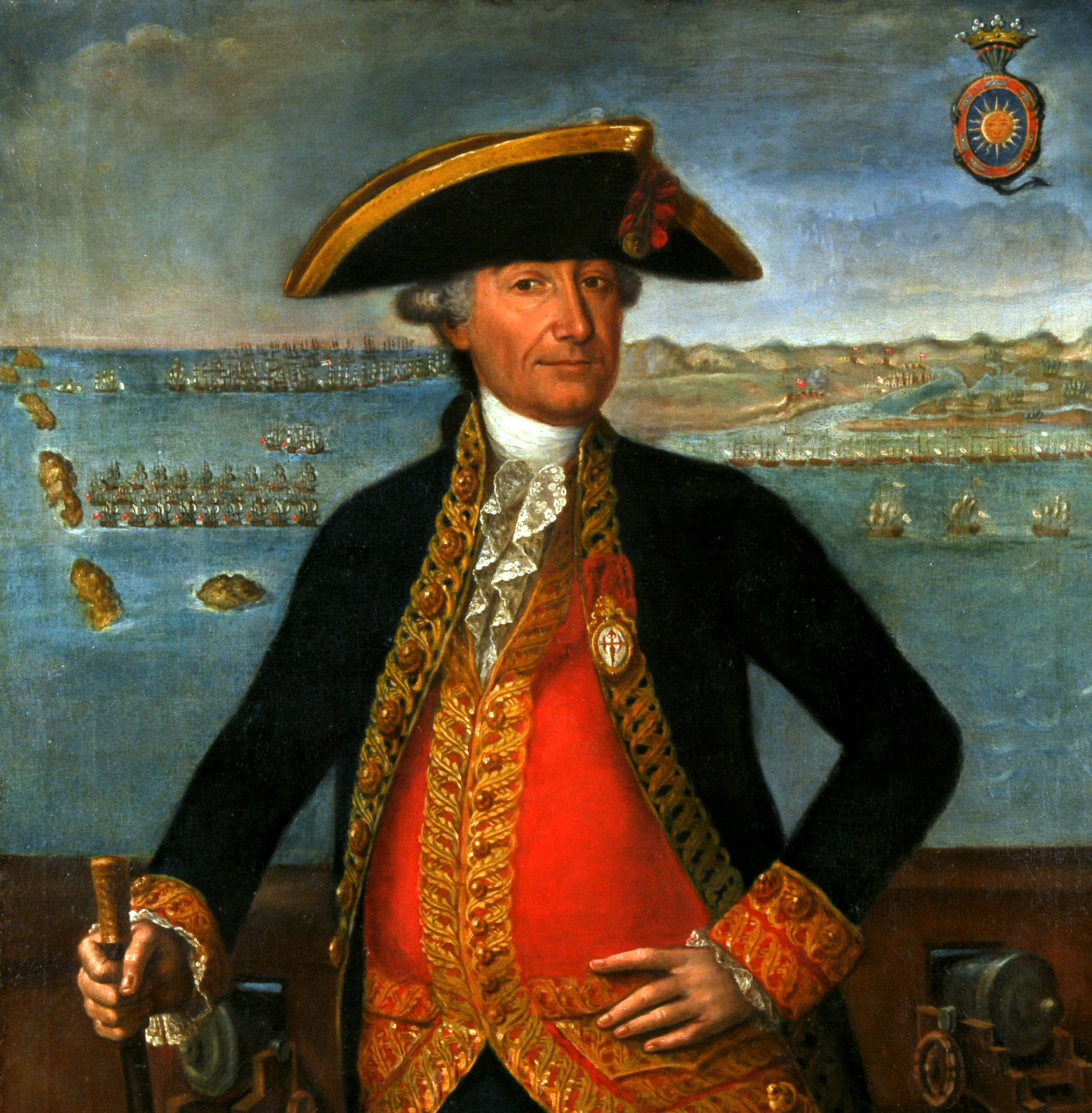
José Solano (1726–1806)

A powerful hurricane in the Eastern Gulf of Mexico struck a Spanish war fleet of 64 vessels under José Solano en route from Havana, Cuba to attack Pensacola, Florida, the capital of British West Florida. The ships had 4,000 men aboard under the military command of Bernardo de Gálvez, and 2,000 died. The slow-moving hurricane, known to history as "Solano's hurricane", was first noted near Jamaica on October 15. Progressing northwestwards it likely crossed the western end of Cuba, before shifting northeastwards to Apalachee Bay. It struck Solano's fleet on October 20. The hurricane's dissipation is disputed as some claim it dissipated somewhere over the southeastern United States around October 22, while others claim that it crossed the U.S. and finally dissipated over the North Atlantic on October 26.

=== Lesser Antilles Hurricane ===
In late October, a tropical cyclone struck Barbados and then St. Lucia on October 23.

=== New England Hurricane ===
Around November 17, a tropical cyclone moved up the east coast of the United States disrupting the British blockade of the New England states. It is unknown whether this storm was fully tropical.

== See also ==
- Lists of Atlantic hurricanes
