= List of Atlantic hurricane records =

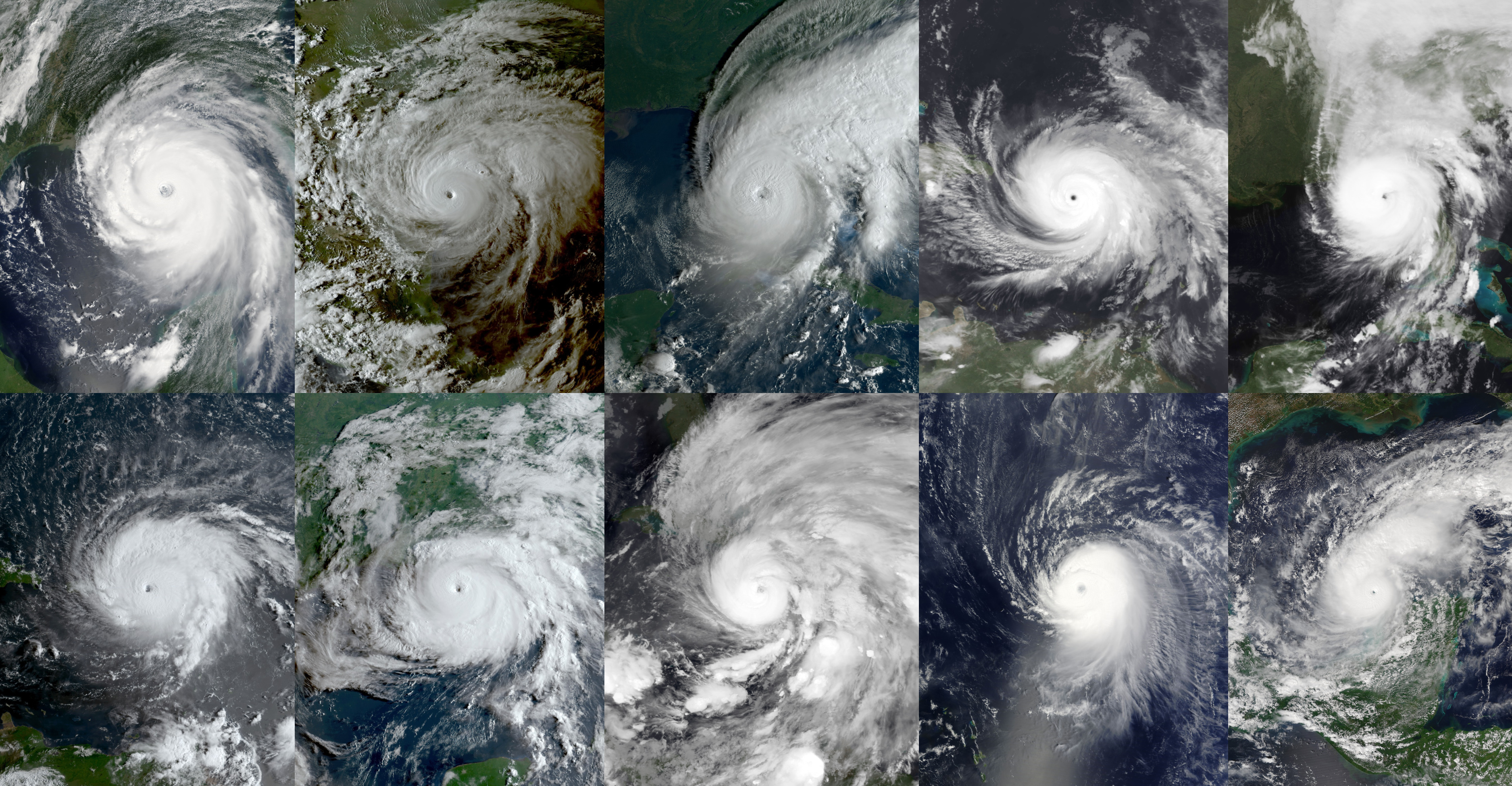
The 10 costliest Atlantic hurricanes as of November 2026.

As of November 2025, there have been 1,753 tropical cyclones of at least tropical storm intensity, 972 at hurricane intensity, and 342 at major hurricane intensity recorded within the Atlantic Ocean since 1851, the first Atlantic hurricane season to be included in the official Atlantic tropical cyclone record. Though a majority of these cyclones have fallen within climatological averages, prevailing atmospheric conditions occasionally lead to anomalous tropical systems which at times reach extremes in statistical record-keeping including in duration and intensity. The scope of this list is limited to tropical cyclone records solely within the North Atlantic Ocean and is subdivided by their reason for notability.

== Tropical cyclogenesis ==
=== Most active / least active Atlantic hurricane seasons ===
Most Atlantic hurricane seasons prior to the weather satellite era include seven or fewer recorded tropical storms or hurricanes. As the usage of satellite data was not available until the mid-1960s, early storm counts are less reliable. Before the advent of the airplane or means of tracking storms, the ones recorded were storms that affected mainly populated areas. An undercount bias of zero to six tropical cyclones per year between 1851 and 1885 and zero to four per year between 1886 and 1910 has been estimated.

With the advent of the satellite came better and more accurate weather tracking. The first satellites sent into space to monitor the weather were known as Television Infrared Observation Satellites (TIROS). In 1961, Hurricane Esther was the first hurricane to be "discovered" through satellite readings. Although this modern invention was now available, the systems were initially not fully active enough to provide daily images of the storms. Data for the North Atlantic region remained sparse as late as 1964 due to a lack of complete satellite coverage.

Due to the above factors, terms such as "ever" or "on record" should be interpreted to mean "since sometime between 1964 and 1978".

The most active Atlantic hurricane season on record in terms of total storms took place in 2020, with 30 documented. The storm count for the 2020 season also includes fourteen hurricanes, of which seven strengthened to major hurricane status. On the converse, the least active season on record in terms of total storms took place in 1914. The 1914 season had just one tropical storm and no hurricanes.

Most storms in a year
Year	Tropical storms	Hurricanes	
Year	Tropical storms	Hurricanes	Major
2020	30 *	14	7
2005	28 *	15	7
2021	21 *	7	4
1933	20	11	6
2023	20 *	7	3
2010	19	12	5
1995	19	11	5
1887	19	11	2
2012	19	10	2
2011	19	7	4
* Includes at least one subtropical storm Source:

Fewest storms in a year
Year	Tropical storms	Hurricanes	
Year	Tropical storms	Hurricanes	Major
1914	1	0	0
1930	3	2	2
1857	4	3	0
1868	4	3	0
1883	4	3	2
1884	4	4	1
1890	4	2	1
1917	4	2	2
1925	4	1	0
1983	4	3	1

=== Earliest / latest formations for each category ===
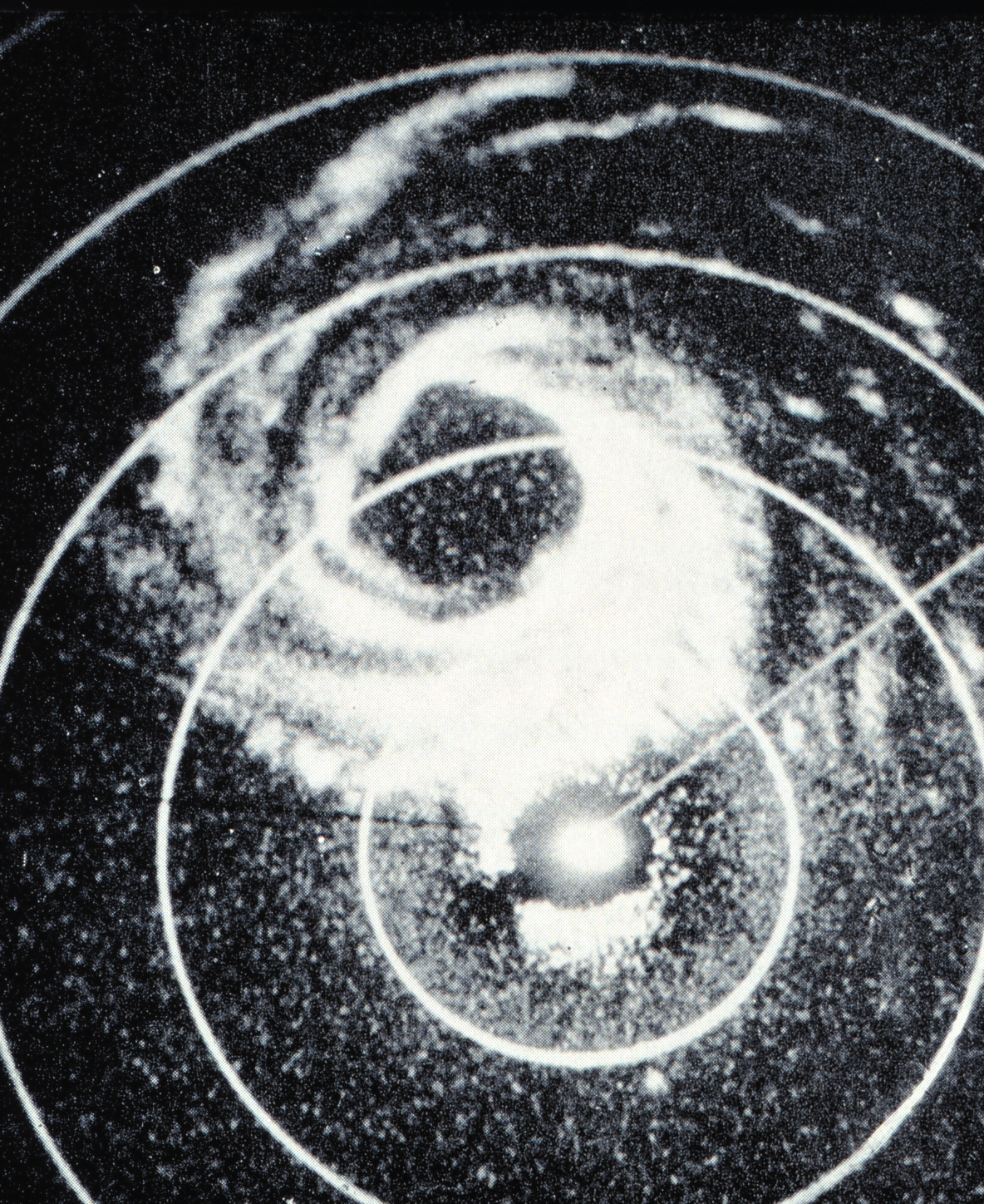
Radar image of Hurricane Alice (1954–55), the only Atlantic tropical cyclone on record to span two calendar years at hurricane strength

Climatologically speaking, approximately 97 percent of tropical cyclones that form in the North Atlantic develop between June 1 and November 30 – dates which delimit the modern-day Atlantic hurricane season. Though the beginning of the annual hurricane season has historically remained the same, the official end of the hurricane season has shifted from its initial date of October 31. Regardless, on average once every few years a tropical cyclone develops outside the limits of the season; as of 2023 there have been 92 tropical cyclones in the off-season, with the most recent being an unnamed subtropical storm in January 2023. The first tropical cyclone of the 1938 Atlantic hurricane season, which formed on January 3, became the earliest forming tropical storm and hurricane after reanalysis concluded on the storm in December 2012. Hurricane Able in 1951 was initially thought to be the earliest forming major hurricane; (Note: Hurricanes reaching Category 3 (111 mph (179 km/h)) and higher on the 5-level Saffir–Simpson wind speed scale are considered major hurricanes.) however, following post-storm analysis, it was determined that Able only reached Category 1 strength, which made Hurricane Alma of 1966 the new record holder, as it became a major hurricane on June 8. Though it developed within the bounds of the Atlantic hurricane season, Hurricane Audrey in 1957 was the earliest developing Category 4 hurricane on record after it reached the intensity on June 27. However, reanalysis of 1956 to 1960 by NOAA downgraded Audrey to a Category 3, making Hurricane Dennis of 2005 the earliest Category 4 on record in the calendar year on July 8, 2005. That mark stood until surpassed by Hurricane Beryl on June 30, 2024. Beryl would also become the earliest Category 5 two days later, surpassing Hurricane Emily of 2005.

Though the official end of the Atlantic hurricane season occurs on November 30, the dates of October 31 and November 15 have also historically marked the official end date for the hurricane season. December, the only month of the year after the hurricane season, has featured the cyclogenesis of fourteen tropical cyclones. The second Hurricane Alice in 1954 was the latest forming tropical storm and hurricane, reaching these intensities on December 30 and 31, respectively. Hurricane Alice and Tropical Storm Zeta were the only two storms to exist in two calendar years – the former from 1954 to 1955 and the latter from 2005 to 2006. No storms have been recorded to exceed Category 1 hurricane intensity in December. In 1999, Hurricane Lenny reached Category 4 intensity on November 17 as it took an unusual west-to-east track across the Caribbean; its intensity made it the latest developing Category 4 hurricane, though this was well within the bounds of the hurricane season. Based on reanalysis, the devastating Cuba hurricane in 1932 reached Category 5 intensity on November 5, making it the latest in any Atlantic hurricane season to reach this intensity. (Note: Although Hurricane Iota in 2020 was operationally analyzed to be a Category 5 hurricane, its peak strength was revised down to Category 4 in the post-season analysis.)

Earliest and latest forming Atlantic tropical / subtropical cyclones by Saffir–Simpson classification
Storm classification	Earliest formation			Latest formation		
Storm classification	Season	Storm	Date reached	Season	Storm	Date reached
Tropical depression	1900	Unnumbered	January 17	1954	Alice	December 30 (Note: 1954's Hurricane Alice and 2005's Tropical Storm Zeta both formed as tropical depressions on December 30; however, Alice formed around 06:00 UTC, about six hours later than Zeta.)
Tropical storm	1938	One	January 3	1954	Alice	December 30 (Note: 1954's Hurricane Alice and 2005's Tropical Storm Zeta both became tropical storms on December 30; however, Alice became a tropical storm around 12:00 UTC, about six hours later than Zeta.)
Category 1	1938	One	January 4	1954	Alice	December 31
Category 2	1908	One	March 7	2016	Otto	November 24
Category 3	1966	Alma	June 8	2016	Otto	November 24
Category 4	2024	Beryl	June 30	1999	Lenny	November 17
Category 5	2024	Beryl	July 2	1932	"Cuba"	November 5

=== Most tropical / subtropical storms formed in each month ===
The Atlantic hurricane season presently runs from June 1 through November 30 each year, with peak activity occurring between August and October. Specifically, the height of the season is in early to mid-September. Tropical systems that form outside of these months are referred to as "off season", and account for roughly 3% of all storms that form in a given year. All of the records included below are for the most storms that formed in a given month, as the threshold for "fewest" is zero for expected months. Cases where "fewest storms" are unusual include the months when the hurricane season is at its peak.

Number of Atlantic tropical / subtropical storm occurrences by month of naming
Month
Month	Most	Season
January	1	1938, 1951, 1978, 2016, 2023
February	1	1952 (Note: Highest number for month by virtue of being the only season on record to have a storm form during that month.)
March	1	1908
April	1	1992, 2003, 2017
May	2	1887, 2012, 2020
June	3	1886, 1909, 1936, 1966, 1968, 2021, 2023
July	5	2005, 2020
August	8	2004, 2012
September	10	2020
October	8	1950
November	3	1931, 1961, 1966, 2001, 2005, 2020, 2024
December	2	1887, 2003

=== Earliest formation records by storm number ===
Earliest and next earliest forming Atlantic tropical / subtropical storms by storm number
Storm number	Earliest		Next earliest	
Storm number	Name	Date of formation	Name	Date of formation
1	One	January 3, 1938	One	January 4, 1951
2	Able	May 16, 1951	Two	May 17, 1887
3	Cristobal	June 2, 2020	Colin	June 5, 2016
4	Danielle	June 20, 2016	Cindy	June 23, 2023 (Note: 2020's Dolly and 2023's Cindy both formed on June 23; however, Cindy became a tropical storm around 0:00 UTC, about six hours before Dolly.)
5	Elsa	July 1, 2021	Edouard	July 6, 2020
6	Fay	July 9, 2020	Franklin	July 21, 2005
7	Gonzalo	July 22, 2020	Gert	July 24, 2005
8	Hanna	July 24, 2020	Harvey	August 3, 2005
9	Isaias	July 30, 2020	Irene	August 7, 2005
10	Josephine	August 13, 2020	Jose	August 22, 2005
11	Kyle	August 14, 2020	Katrina	August 24, 2005
12	Laura	August 21, 2020	Luis	August 29, 1995
13	Marco	August 22, 2020	Maria	September 2, 2005 (Note: 2005's Maria and 2011's Lee both formed on September 2 and each became a tropical storm around 12:00 UTC.)
13	Marco	August 22, 2020	Lee	September 2, 2011 (Note: 2011's Lee and 2005's Maria both formed on September 2 and each became a tropical storm around 12:00 UTC.)
14	Nana	September 1, 2020	Nate	September 5, 2005
15	Omar	September 1, 2020	Ophelia	September 7, 2005 (Note: 2005's Ophelia and 2011's Nate both formed on September 7; however, Ophelia became a tropical storm around 06:00 UTC, about 12 hours before Nate.)
16	Paulette	September 7, 2020	Philippe	September 17, 2005
17	Rene	September 7, 2020	Rita	September 18, 2005
18	Sally	September 12, 2020	Sam	September 23, 2021
19	Teddy	September 14, 2020	Teresa	September 24, 2021
20	Vicky	September 14, 2020	Victor	September 29, 2021
21	Alpha	September 17, 2020	Vince	October 9, 2005
22	Wilfred	September 17, 2020	Wilma	October 17, 2005
23	Beta	September 18, 2020	Alpha	October 22, 2005
24	Gamma	October 2, 2020	Beta	October 27, 2005
25	Delta	October 5, 2020	Gamma	November 15, 2005
26	Epsilon	October 19, 2020	Delta	November 22, 2005
27	Zeta	October 25, 2020	Epsilon	November 29, 2005
28	Eta	November 1, 2020	Zeta	December 30, 2005
29	Theta	November 10, 2020	Earliest formation by virtue of being the only of that number	
30	Iota	November 13, 2020	Earliest formation by virtue of being the only of that number	

== Intensity ==
=== Most intense ===
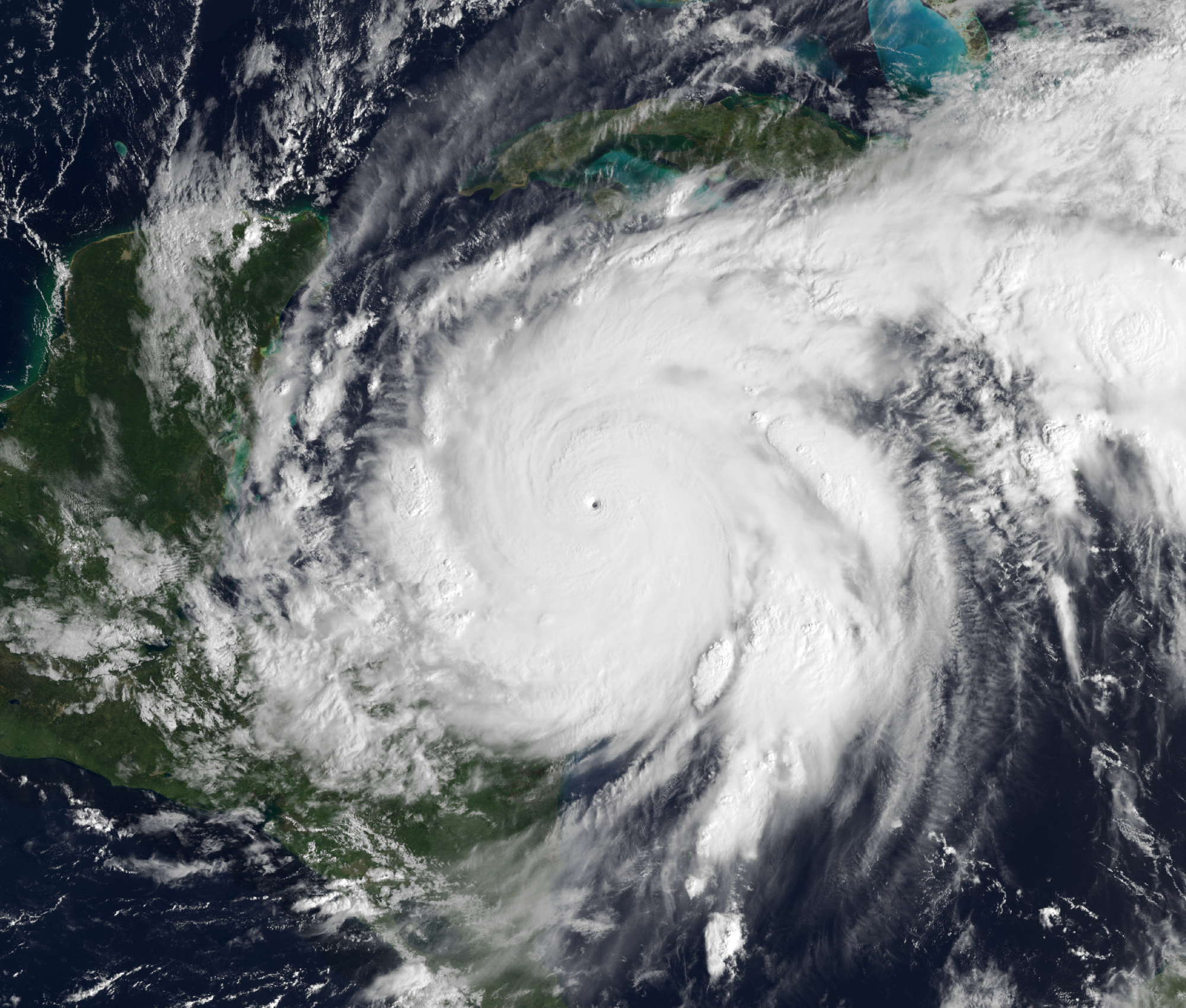
At peak intensity, Hurricane Wilma had a minimum central pressure of 882 mbar, the lowest of any Atlantic hurricane.

Generally speaking, the intensity of a tropical cyclone is determined by either the storm's maximum sustained winds or lowest barometric pressure. The following table lists the most intense Atlantic hurricanes in terms of their lowest barometric pressure. In terms of wind speed, Allen from 1980 and Melissa from 2025 are tied for the strongest Atlantic tropical cyclones on record, with maximum sustained winds of 190 mph (305 km/h). For many years, it was thought that Hurricane Camille also attained this intensity, but this conclusion was changed in 2014. The original measurements of Camille are suspect since wind speed instrumentation used at the time would likely be damaged by winds of such intensity. Nonetheless, their central pressures are low enough to rank them among the strongest recorded Atlantic hurricanes. This is also why despite there being 2 hurricanes in the month of January, neither of them are ranked here as both of them had a higher pressure than Unnamed Subtropical Storm (2023).

Owing to their intensity, the strongest Atlantic hurricanes have all attained Category 5 classification. Hurricane Opal, the most intense Category 4 hurricane recorded, intensified to reach a minimum pressure of 916 mbar (hPa; 27.05 inHg), a pressure typical of Category 5 hurricanes. Nonetheless, the pressure remains too high to list Opal as one of the ten strongest Atlantic tropical cyclones. Currently, Hurricane Wilma is the strongest Atlantic hurricane ever recorded, after reaching an intensity of 882 mbar (hPa; 26.05 inHg) in October 2005; at the time, this also made Wilma the strongest tropical cyclone worldwide outside of the West Pacific, where seven tropical cyclones have been recorded to intensify to lower pressures. However, this was later superseded by Hurricane Patricia in 2015 in the east Pacific, which had a pressure reading of 872 mbar. Preceding Wilma is Hurricane Gilbert, which had also held the record for most intense Atlantic hurricane for 17 years. The 1935 Labor Day hurricane, with a pressure of 892 mbar (hPa; 26.34 inHg), is the third strongest Atlantic hurricane and the strongest documented tropical cyclone prior to 1950. Since the measurements taken during Wilma and Gilbert were documented using dropsonde, this pressure remains the lowest measured over land. In 2025, Hurricane Melissa reached a pressure of 892 mbar (hPa; 26.34 inHg), tying the 1935 Labor Day hurricane as the third-most-intense Atlantic hurricane.

2005's Hurricane Rita and 2024's Hurricane Milton are tied as the fifth strongest Atlantic hurricane in terms of barometric pressure. Rita is one of three tropical cyclones from 2005 on the list, with the others being Wilma and Katrina at first and ninth, respectively, while Milton is the only storm from the 2024 season to be on the list. However, with a barometric pressure of 895 mbar (hPa; 26.43 inHg), Rita and Milton are both the strongest tropical cyclone ever recorded in the Gulf of Mexico. In between Milton and Camille is 1980's Hurricane Allen. Allen's pressure was measured at 899 mbar. Hurricane Camille is the eighth strongest hurricane on record. Camille is the only storm to have been moved down the list due to post-storm analysis. Camille was originally recognized as the fifth strongest hurricane on record, but was dropped to the seventh strongest at the time in 2014, with an estimated pressure at 905 mbars, tying it with Hurricanes Mitch, and Dean. Camille then was recategorized with a new pressure of 900 mbars. Mitch and Dean share intensities for the tenth strongest Atlantic hurricane at 905 mbar (hPa; 26.73 inHg). Hurricane Maria is in eleventh place for most intense Atlantic tropical cyclone, with a pressure as low as 908 mbar (hPa; 26.81 inHg). In addition, the most intense Atlantic hurricane outside of the Caribbean Sea and Gulf of Mexico is Hurricane Dorian of 2019, with a pressure of 910 mbar (hPa; 26.9 inHg), next most intense in the open ocean was Hurricane Irma of 2017, with a pressure of 914 mbar.

Many of the strongest recorded tropical cyclones weakened prior to their eventual landfall or demise. However, five of the storms remained intense enough at landfall to be considered some of the strongest landfalling hurricanes – five of the eleven hurricanes on the list constitute five of the top ten most intense Atlantic landfalls in recorded history. The 1935 Labor Day hurricane made landfall at peak intensity, making it the most intense Atlantic hurricane landfall. Hurricane Melissa made landfall near New Hope in Westmoreland Parish, Jamaica with a pressure of 897 mbar (hPa; 26.49 inHg), making it the second most intense Atlantic hurricane landfall. Hurricane Camille made landfall in Waveland, Mississippi with a pressure of 900 mbar (hPa; 26.58 inHg), making it the third most intense Atlantic hurricane landfall. Though it weakened slightly before its eventual landfall on the Yucatán Peninsula, Hurricane Gilbert maintained a pressure of 900 mbar (hPa; 26.58 inHg) at landfall, making its landfall the third strongest, tied with Camille. Similarly, Hurricane Dean made landfall on the peninsula, though it did so at peak intensity and with a higher barometric pressure; its landfall marked the fifth strongest in Atlantic hurricane history.

- Note: Dropsondes have only been GPS-based for use in eyewalls since 1997, and the quantity of aircraft reconnaissance and surface observation stations has changed over time, such that values from storms in different periods may not be 100% consistent.

==== Most intense by month ====
Intensity is measured solely by central pressure unless the pressure is not known, in which case intensity is measured by maximum sustained winds.

Month	Name	Year	Minimum pressure	Maximum winds	Classification
January	Unnamed	2023	976 mb (hPa)	70 mph (110 km/h)	Subtropical storm
February	One†	1952	≤ 990 mb (hPa)	50 mph (85 km/h)	Tropical storm
March	One†	1908	<984 mb (hPa)	100 mph (155 km/h)	Category 2
April	Arlene	2017	990 mb (hPa)	50 mph (85 km/h)	Tropical storm
May	Able	1951	973 mb (hPa)	90 mph (150 km/h)	Category 1
June	Audrey	1957	946 mb (hPa)	125 mph (205 km/h)	Category 3
July	Emily	2005	929 mb (hPa)	160 mph (260 km/h)	Category 5
August	Allen	1980	899 mb (hPa)	190 mph (305 km/h)	Category 5
September	Gilbert	1988	888 mb (hPa)	185 mph (295 km/h)	Category 5
October	Wilma	2005	882 mb (hPa)	185 mph (295 km/h)	Category 5
November	1932 Cuba hurricane	1932	<915 mb (hPa)	175 mph (280 km/h)	Category 5
December	Nicole	1998	979 mb (hPa)	85 mph (140 km/h)	Category 1
† Most intense by virtue of being the only recorded in that month

==== Most intense by minimum barometric pressure ====
Most intense Atlantic hurricanes
Hurricane	Season	By peak pressure		By pressure at landfall	
Hurricane	Season	mbar	inHg	mbar	inHg
Wilma	2005	882	26.05		
Gilbert	1988	888	26.22	900	26.58
"Labor Day"	1935	892	26.34	892	26.34
Melissa	2025	892	26.34	897	26.49
Rita	2005	895	26.43		
Milton	2024	895	26.43		
Allen	1980	899	26.55		
Camille	1969	900	26.58	900	26.58
Katrina	2005	902	26.64		
Mitch	1998	905	26.72		
Dean	2007	905	26.72	905	26.72
"Cuba"	1924			910	26.87
Dorian	2019			910	26.87
Janet	1955			914	26.99
Irma	2017			914	26.99
"Cuba"	1932			918	27.10
Note: A blank cell indicates that the pressure is not in the top 10 for that column.

==== Strongest by 1-minute sustained wind speed ====
Strongest Atlantic hurricanes
Hurricane	Season	By peak sustained wind speed		By wind speed at landfall	
Hurricane	Season	mph	km/h	mph	km/h
Melissa	2025	190	305	185	295
Allen	1980	190	305		
"Labor Day"	1935	185	295	185	295
Gilbert	1988	185	295		
Wilma	2005	185	295		
Dorian	2019	185	295	185	295
Mitch	1998	180	285		
Rita	2005	180	285		
Irma	2017	180	285	180	285
Milton	2024	180	285		
"Cuba"	1932	175	280		
Janet	1955	175	280	175	280
Camille	1969	175	280	175	280
Anita	1977	175	280	175	280
David	1979	175	280	175	280
Andrew	1992	175	280	165	270
Katrina	2005	175	280		
Dean	2007	175	280	175	280
Felix	2007	175	280	165	270
Maria	2017	175	280	165	270
Note: A blank cell indicates that the winds were not among the top 10 for that column.

=== Fastest intensification ===
- Fastest intensification from a tropical depression to a hurricane (1-minute sustained surface winds) – 12 hours
  Harvey 1981 – 35 mph (55 km/h) to 80 mph (130 km/h) – from 1200 UTC September 12 to 0000 UTC September 13
- Fastest intensification from a tropical depression to a Category 5 hurricane (1-minute sustained surface winds) – 54 hours
  Milton 2024 – 35 mph (55 km/h) to 175 mph (280 km/h) – from 1200 UTC October 5 to 1800 UTC October 7
- Fastest intensification from a tropical storm to a Category 5 hurricane (1-minute sustained surface winds) – 24 hours
  Wilma 2005 – 70 mph (110 km/h) to 175 mph (275 km/h) – from 0600 UTC October 18 to 0600 UTC October 19
- Maximum pressure drop in 12 hours – 83 mbar
  Wilma 2005 – 975 millibars (28.8 inHg) to 892 millibars (26.3 inHg) – from 1800 UTC October 18 to 0600 UTC October 19
- Maximum pressure drop in 24 hours – 97 mbar
  Wilma 2005 – 979 millibars (28.9 inHg) to 882 millibars (26.0 inHg) – from 1200 UTC October 18 to 1200 UTC October 19

== Landfall ==
=== Earliest and latest Atlantic landfalls ===
Earliest and latest Atlantic tropical / subtropical cyclones landfall by Saffir–Simpson classification
Storm classification	Earliest landfall			Latest landfall		
Storm classification	Season	Storm	Date of landfall	Season	Storm	Date of landfall
Tropical depression	1899	Unnumbered	May 2	1984	Unnumbered	November 23
Tropical storm	2016	Alex	January 15	2007	Olga	December 18
Category 1	1954	Alice	January 2	1999	Lenny	November 19 (Note: The 1822 Martinique–Venezuela hurricane may have had a later landfall on December 22, but occurred outside the official database.)
Category 2	1966	Alma	June 8 (Note: Hurricane "Amanda" in 1863 may have had an earlier landfall on May 28, but isn't included in the official database.)	1985	Kate	November 21
Category 3	1957	Audrey	June 27	2016	Otto	November 24
Category 4	2024	Beryl	July 1	2020	Iota	November 17
Category 5	1969	Camille	August 18 (Note: The 1825 Santa Ana hurricane may have had an earlier landfall on July 26, but occurred outside the official database.)	2025	Melissa	October 28

=== Southern and northernmost Atlantic landfalls ===
Southern and Northernmost Atlantic tropical / subtropical cyclones landfall by Saffir–Simpson classification
Storm classification	Southernmost landfall			Northernmost landfall		
Storm classification	Season	Storm	Latitude of landfall	Season	Storm	Latitude of landfall
Tropical depression	2002	Isidore	10.1°N	1979	Six	47.8°N
Tropical storm	1969	Martha	8.8°N	1973	Alice	51.5°N
Category 1	1933	"Trinidad"	10.1°N	2002	Gustav	47.6°N
Category 2	1963	Flora	11.2°N	2003	Juan	44.4°N
Category 3	2016	Otto	11.0°N	1869	Six	41.4°N
Category 4	1988	Joan	11.9°N	1954	Hazel	33.8°N (Note: The Great Colonial Hurricane of 1635 may have had a more northern landfall at 40.9°N, but occurred outside the official database.)
Category 5	2007	Felix	14.3°N	1969	Camille	30.1°N (Note: The 1821 Norfolk and Long Island hurricane may have had a more northern landfall at 35.0°N, but occurred outside the official database.)

== Effects ==
=== Costliest Atlantic hurricanes ===
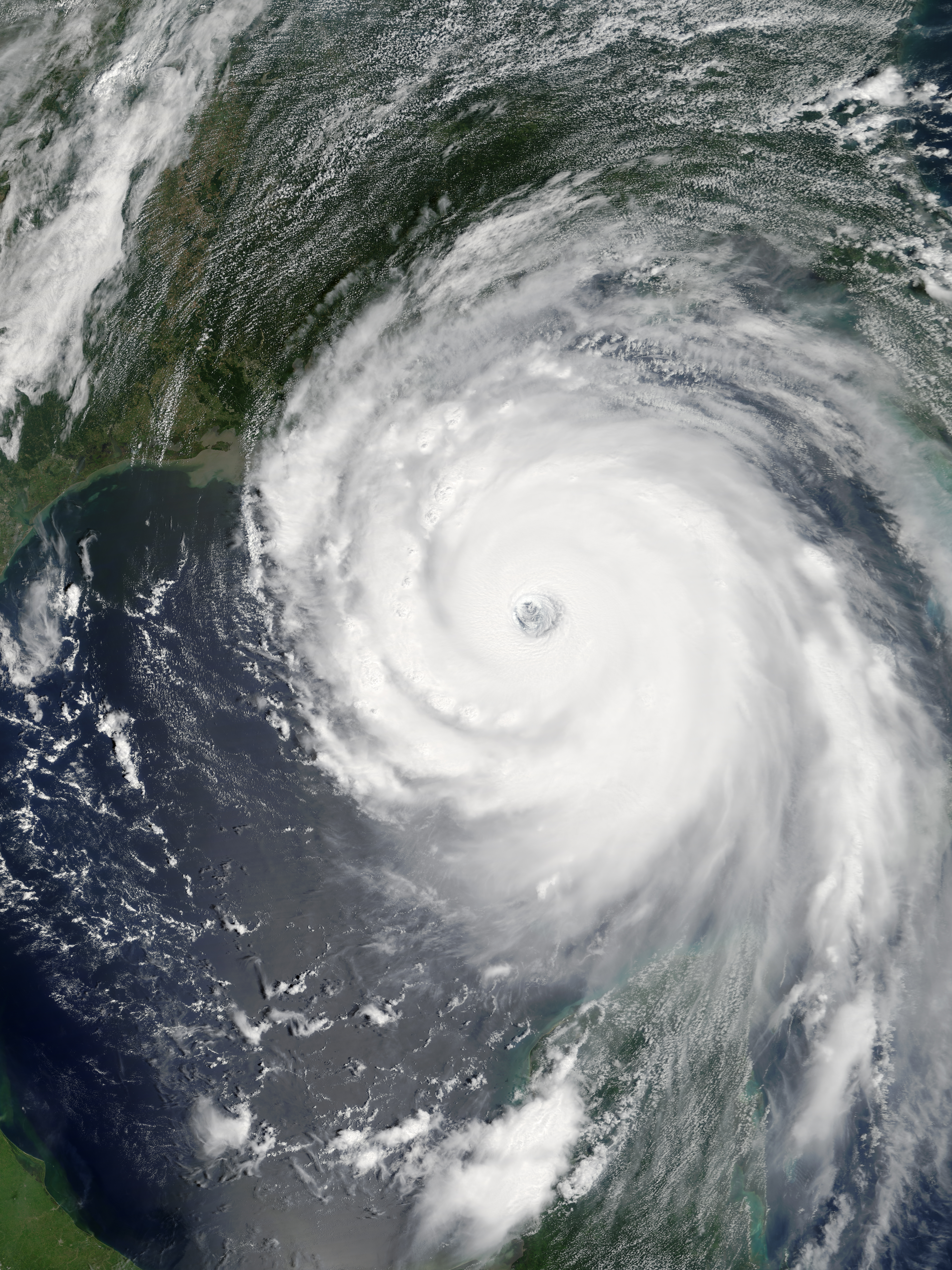
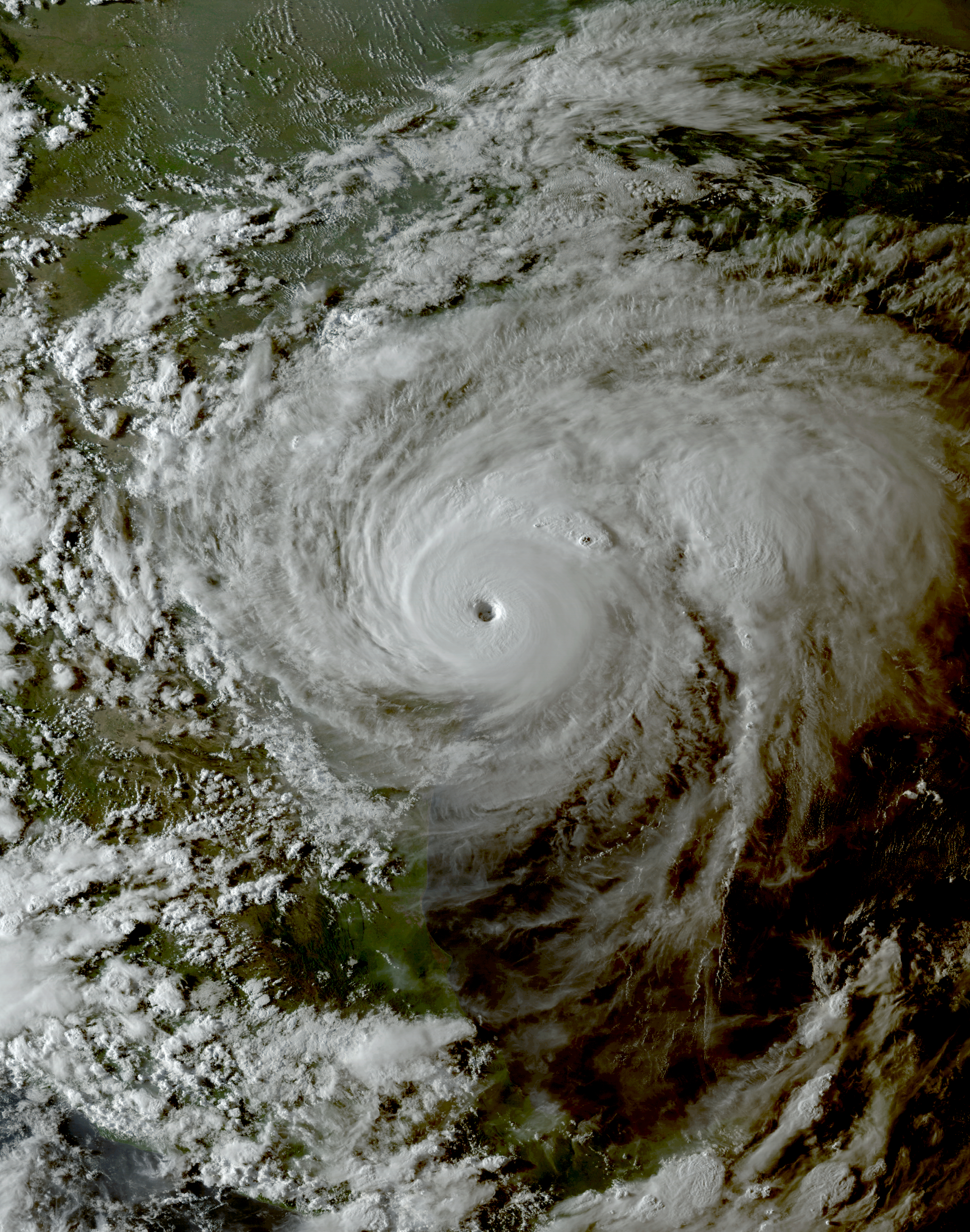
Hurricanes Katrina (left) and Harvey (right) both caused $125 billion in damage, more than any other tropical cyclone worldwide.

Costliest Atlantic hurricanes
Rank	Hurricane	Season	Damage (Note: All damage figures are in United States dollars, and are not adjusted for inflation.)
1	5 Katrina	2005	$125 billion
1	4 Harvey	2017	$125 billion
3	5 Ian	2022	$113 billion
4	5 Maria	2017	$91.6 billion
5	4 Helene	2024	$78.7 billion
6	5 Irma	2017	$77.2 billion
7	4 Ida	2021	$75.3 billion
8	3 Sandy	2012	$68.7 billion
9	4 Ike	2008	$38 billion
10	5 Milton	2024	$34.3 billion
Note: Figures are not adjusted for inflation.

=== Deadliest Atlantic hurricanes ===
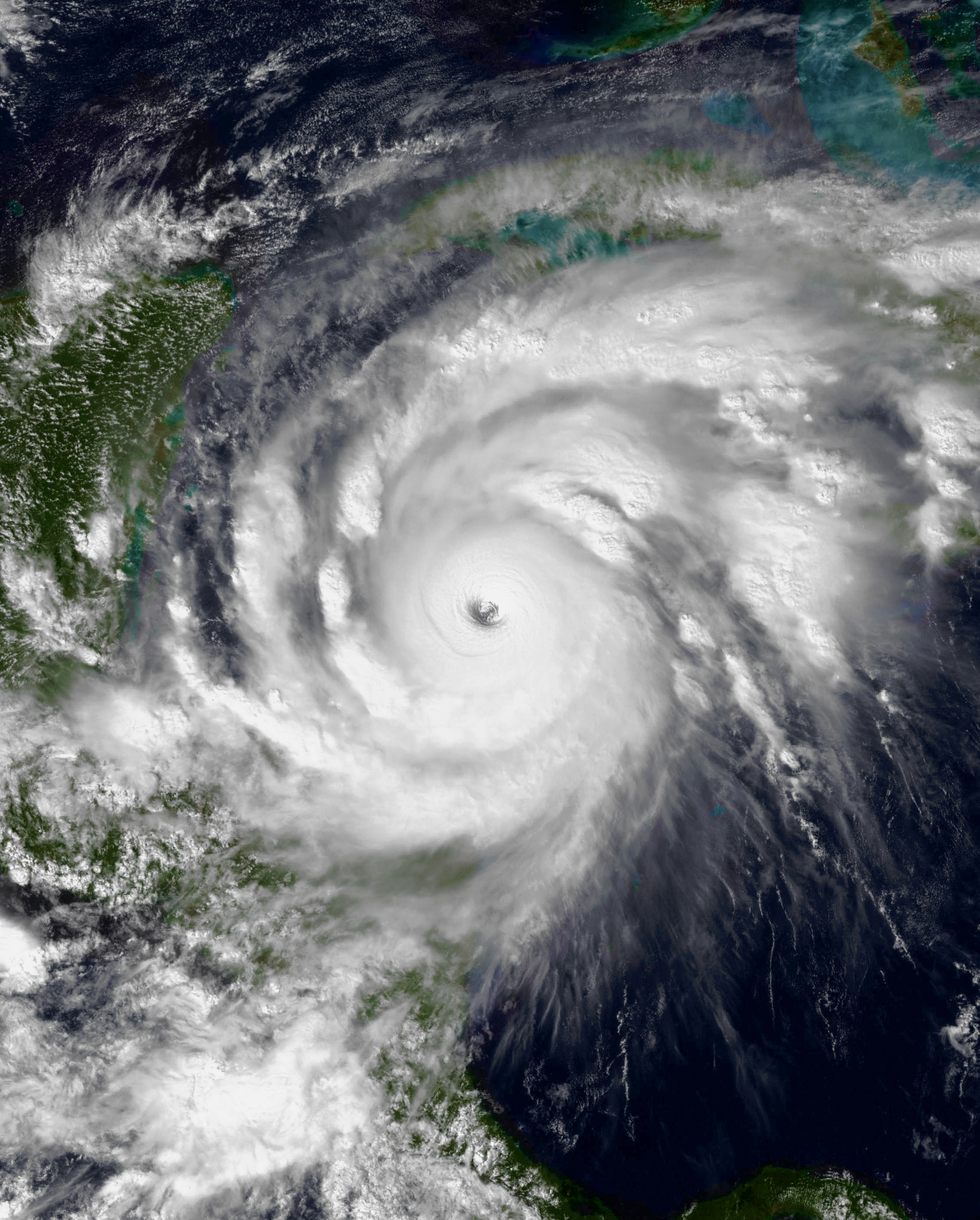
Hurricane Mitch killed at least 11,374 people in Central America in October 1998.

Deadliest Atlantic hurricanes
Rank	Hurricane	Season	Fatalities
1	? "Great Hurricane"	1780	22,000–27,501
2	5 Mitch	1998	11,374+
3	2 Fifi	1974	8,210–10,000
4	4 "Galveston"	1900	8,000–12,000
5	4 Flora	1963	7,193
6	? "Pointe-à-Pitre"	1776	6,000+
7	5 "Okeechobee"	1928	4,112+
8	? "Newfoundland"	1775	4,000–4,163
9	3 "Monterrey"	1909	4,000
10	4 "San Ciriaco"	1899	3,855

=== Most tornadoes spawned ===
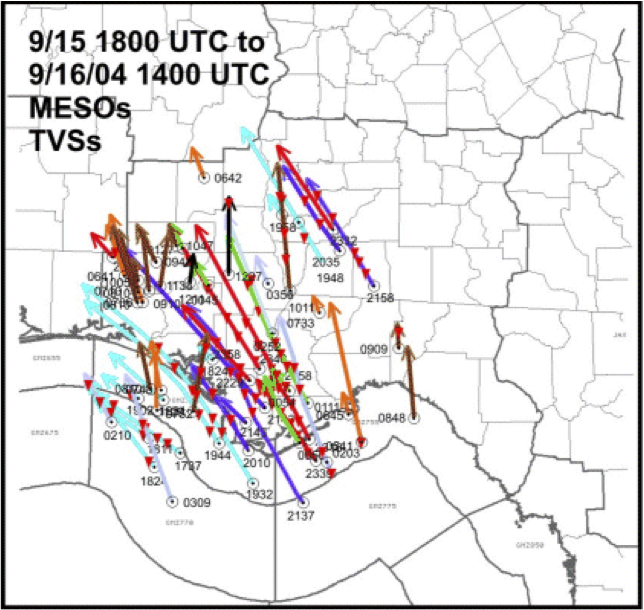
Tracks of the 50 mesocyclones and multiple tornado vortex signatures (denoted by inverted red triangles) identified by the NWS Office in Tallahassee Florida September 15–16, 2004.

Number of tornadoes spawned
Rank	Count	Name	Year
1	120	5 Ivan	2004
2	115	5 Beulah	1967
3	103	4 Frances	2004
4	101	5 Rita	2005
5	68	5 Beryl	2024
6	57	5 Katrina	2005
7	54	4 Harvey	2017
8	50	TS Fay	2008
9	49	4 Gustav	2008
10	47	4 Georges	1998

== Miscellaneous records ==
Miscellaneous records
Record	Value	Name	Season
Distance traveled	6,500 miles (10,500 km)	3 Alberto	2000
Highest forward speed	69 mph (111 km/h)	TS Six	1961
Largest in diameter	1,150 miles (1,850 km)	3 Sandy	2012
Longest duration (non consecutive)	28 days	4 "San Ciriaco"	1899
Longest duration (consecutive)	27.25 days	3 Ginger	1971
Longest duration (at category 5)	3.6 days	5 "Cuba"	1932
Northernmost tropical or subtropical cyclone formation	43.5°N, 34.8°W	SS Karen	2025
Southernmost tropical cyclone formation	7.2°N, 23.4°W	2 Isidore	1990
Easternmost tropical cyclone formation	11.0°N, 14.0°W	TS Christine	1973
Westernmost tropical cyclone formation	22.4°N, 97.4°W	TD Eight	2013

== Worldwide cyclone records set by Atlantic storms ==
- Costliest tropical cyclone: Hurricane Katrina – 2005 and Hurricane Harvey – 2017 – US$125 billion in damages
- Fastest seafloor current produced by a tropical cyclone: Hurricane Ivan – 2004 – 2.25 m/s (5 mph)
- Highest confirmed wave produced by a tropical cyclone: Hurricane Luis – 1995 – 98 feet (30 m)
- Highest forward speed of a tropical cyclone: Tropical Storm Six – 1961 – 69 mph (111 km/h)
- Most tornadoes spawned by a tropical cyclone: Hurricane Ivan – 2004 – 120 confirmed tornadoes
- Smallest tropical cyclone on record: Tropical Storm Marco – 2008 – gale-force winds extended 11.5 mi (18.5 km) from storm center
- Smallest tropical cyclone eye on record: Hurricane Wilma – 2005 – diameter 2.3 miles (3.7 km)

== See also ==
- List of tropical cyclone records
- List of Pacific hurricane records
- Outline of tropical cyclones
