= 1908 March hurricane =

Category 2 Atlantic hurricane

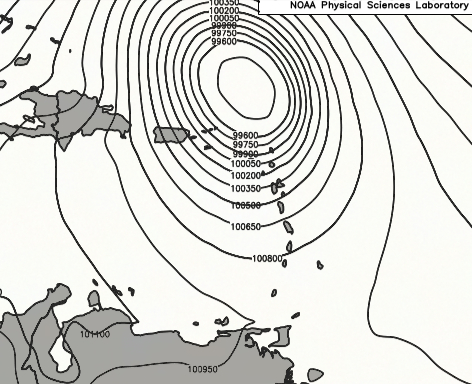
- The hurricane shown by the 20th Century Reanalysis dataset (20CRV3) on March 7, 15z.

Meteorological history
- Formed: March 6, 1908
- Dissipated: March 9, 1908

Category 2 hurricane
- 1-minute sustained (SSHWS/NWS)
- Highest winds: 100 mph (155 km/h)
- Lowest pressure: <984 mbar (hPa); <29.06 inHg (lowest measured)

Overall effects
- Fatalities: At least 1
- Damage: Unknown
- Areas affected: Leeward Islands (especially Saint Kitts and Nevis)
- Part of the 1908 Atlantic hurricane season

The 1908 March hurricane was an extraordinarily rare Atlantic hurricane that struck the Leeward Islands and Caribbean in early March. It is one of two hurricanes to make a landfall before the March equinox, and the only known hurricane to reach Category 2 status during the basin's off-season. (Note: The Atlantic database called "HURDAT" begins in 1851.) It is also the only tropical cyclone, within the basin, observed within the month of March.

The storm was first noted around 500 miles (805 km) northeast of San Juan, Puerto Rico. It then continued in an unusual and rare southwest trajectory before striking the island of Saint Kitts as a hurricane. The last observation occurred some 130 mi (210 km) north of Blanquilla on March 9.

Since the beginning of the basin's official database in 1851, no tropical storm has existed within a month before or after the formation of the hurricane. Only 3 hurricanes have been observed earlier into the calendar year, with all of them occurring in January. The earliest known hurricane proceeding the formation of the storm occurred in mid-May of 1951.

== Meteorological history ==
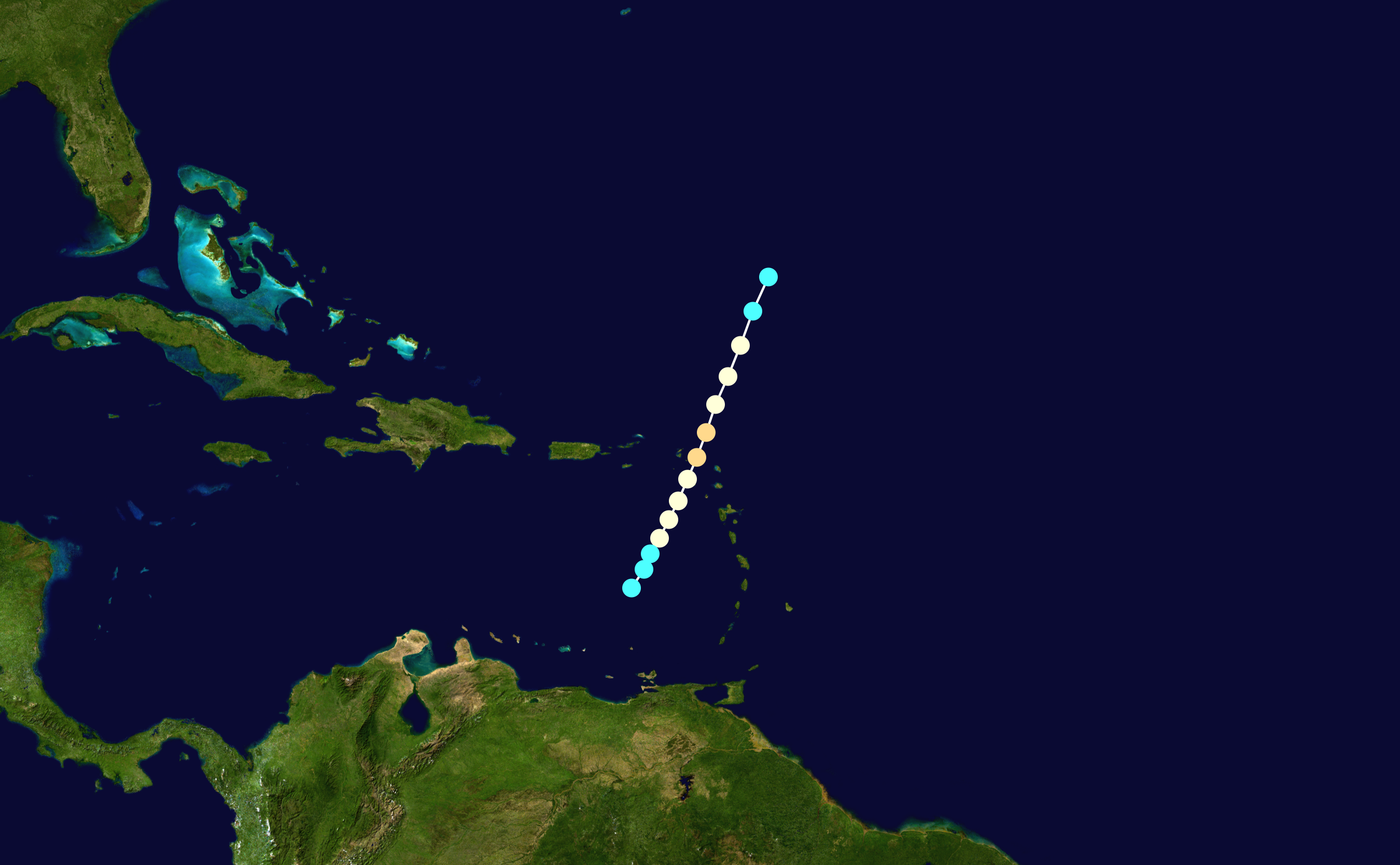
Map plotting the storm's track and intensity, according to the Saffir–Simpson scale Map key Saffir–Simpson scale Tropical depression (≤38 mph, ≤62 km/h) Tropical storm (39–73 mph, 63–118 km/h) Category 1 (74–95 mph, 119–153 km/h) Category 2 (96–110 mph, 154–177 km/h) Category 3 (111–129 mph, 178–208 km/h) Category 4 (130–156 mph, 209–251 km/h) Category 5 (≥157 mph, ≥252 km/h) Unknown Storm type Tropical cyclone Subtropical cyclone Extratropical cyclone, remnant low, tropical disturbance, or monsoon depression

The first observation of the storm was by a ship on March 6, at 12:00 UTC. Since the storm was already an intense tropical storm upon discovery, it attained hurricane status just 12 hours later. As the hurricane continued towards the southwest, it steadily intensified despite the hostile conditions that are typically present throughout the March equinox. Later that day on March 7, the hurricane intensified into a Category 2 with sustained winds of 100 mph (160 km/h). Peak intensity occurred around this time, roughly 30 miles (42 km) east of Saint Martin where their aneroid recorded a pressure of 988 mbar (29.2 inHg). Shortly afterwards, the hurricane made its first and only landfall in Saint Kitts.

Around 2 am local, Nevis recorded a minimum barometric pressure of 984 mbar (29.1 inHg). It held steady for half an hour, and occurred well outside the storm's center. The winds were reportedly of "hurricane force" at the time measurement too. Basseterre, St. Kitts also recorded a pressure of 991 mbar (29.3 inHg) that morning outside the center. In Antigua, roughly 70 miles (113 km) from the cyclone, it stood at 1,003 mbar (29.6 inHg). At 3 am, Saint Tomas had a reading of 1,009 mbar (29.8 inHg).

After passing through the Leeward Islands, the hurricane began gradually weakening. It then fell below hurricane status at 06:00 UTC, March 9. The storm was lasted noted by ship before dissipating a couple hours later. However, in the absence of modern satellite and other remote-sensing technologies, the storm's path and intensity beyond this point may have gone undocumented.

== Impact ==
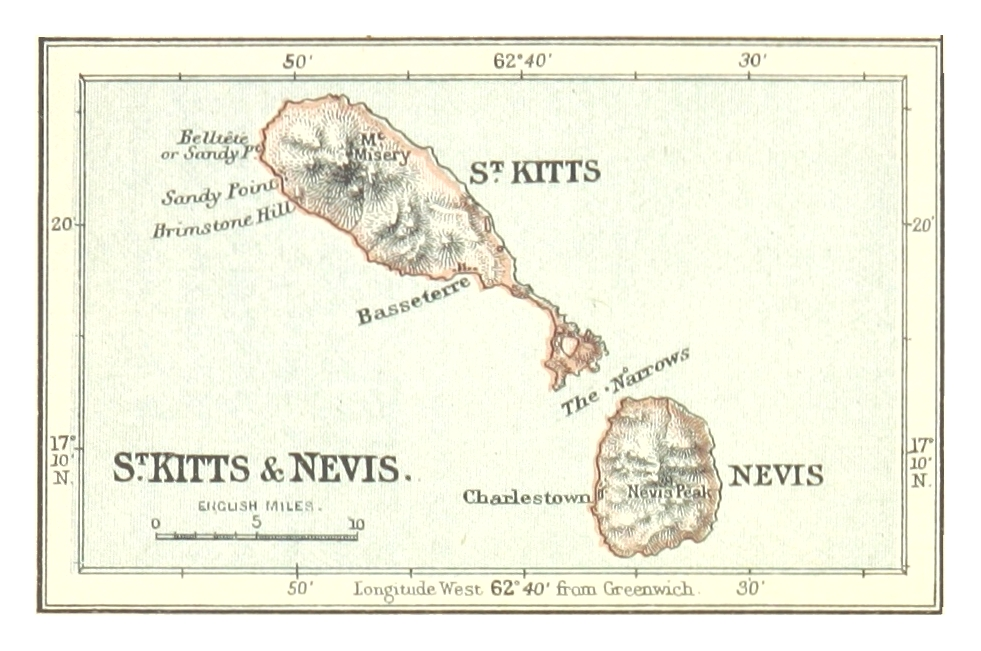
A late 19th century map of Saint Kitts & Nevis.

It would seem that the cyclone in question followed a track opposite in every particular to the track usually followed by cyclones originating within the tropics in the hurricane season.

— John T. Quin - May 1908

While passing through the Leeward Islands, damaging winds, heavy rainfall, and widespread destruction was reported on several islands.

On March 6, Saint Croix experienced partly blue skies, rough seas, and a strong wind from the north. By March 7, the seas and wind began to worsen and shifted toward the northeast. The weather continued to deteriorate into the morning. By 8 am local, the wind shifted ENE, to then SE at 11 am, and east at 4 pm. It remained gusty, but gradually decreased throughout the day. Rainfall amounted to less than 1 inch (2.5 cm), and a few trees were knocked down. On that same day, Saint Tomas also experienced a heavy gale from the northwest and a drop in pressure. However, no damage was reported.

In Saint Martin, winds damaged buildings and ruined crops. In Saint Barthélemy, many buildings either damaged or completely blown down. Vessels were also blown out to sea along the leeside of Saint Eustatiu. A ship call "Sea Hawk" was taken off her anchorage and discovered in Arroyo, Puerto Rico weeks later. These islands were said to have been "devastated" by the hurricane.

Extreme winds, rain, and damage was experienced in Saint Kitts. Crops were reportedly "severely damaged", with much of it being leveled into the ground. At least 24 vessels and boats were driven ashore and were either badly damaged or entirely destroyed. Trees and property were also blown down, while telephone lines stood damaged. In Nevis, extensive damage was caused by the storm. Ships were reportedly smashed into pieces within the wharf, while large parts of ports were either carried away or destroyed.

Upon sunrise, the havoc and destruction was much more apparent. At least 1 man drowned when his ship sunk, while other reports on fatalities remain unknown. Rainfall totals reached over 8 inches (20.3 cm) near Cayon, 4 inches (10.2 cm) in Basseterre, and 3 inches (7.6 cm) in Nevis.

== Records ==
Atlantic tropical storm and hurricane frequency by month (1851–2017).

The 1908 hurricane formed opposite to that of the climatological peak of its season. Despite this, it still managed to be the first tropical cyclone to achieve Category 2 status during the off-season. 1-minute sustained winds peaked at 100 mph (160 km/h), which also makes it the strongest tropical cyclone before June.

The storm was described as unusual and a first of its kind by locals. Most notably was its unusual southwest trajectory and appearance so odd in the calendar year. Despite its intensity, no other Atlantic tropical cyclone has been documented in March. (Note: While Hurricane Catarina occurred in March, it was documented in the South Atlantic.) It is also the only storm to have reached hurricane status during the winter months of February–March–April (FMA).

Its landfall in Saint Kitts is the second earliest for a hurricane, only surpassed by Hurricane Alice on January 2nd. (Note: A hurricane in 1541 likely did so earlier in January, but occurred before records began.) It is also one of only two known hurricanes to strike the Lesser Antilles with non-tropical origins.

== See also ==
- List of off-season Atlantic hurricanes
- List of Category 2 Atlantic hurricanes
- 1908 May hurricane – Another pre-season hurricane that occurred the same year.
- 1952 Groundhog Day tropical storm – The only Atlantic tropical cyclone documented in February.
- Hurricane Alice (1954/1955) – Another rare off-season hurricane with a similar track.
- Hurricane Georges (1998) – A more recent hurricane to make a landfall on Saint Kitts and Nevis.
- Hurricane Catarina (2004) – The only other Atlantic hurricane to occur in March, that happened in the South Atlantic.
- Tropical Storm Arlene (2017) – A relatively rare April tropical cyclone that became the most intense for that month.
