= Atlantic hurricane =

Tropical cyclone that forms in the Atlantic Ocean

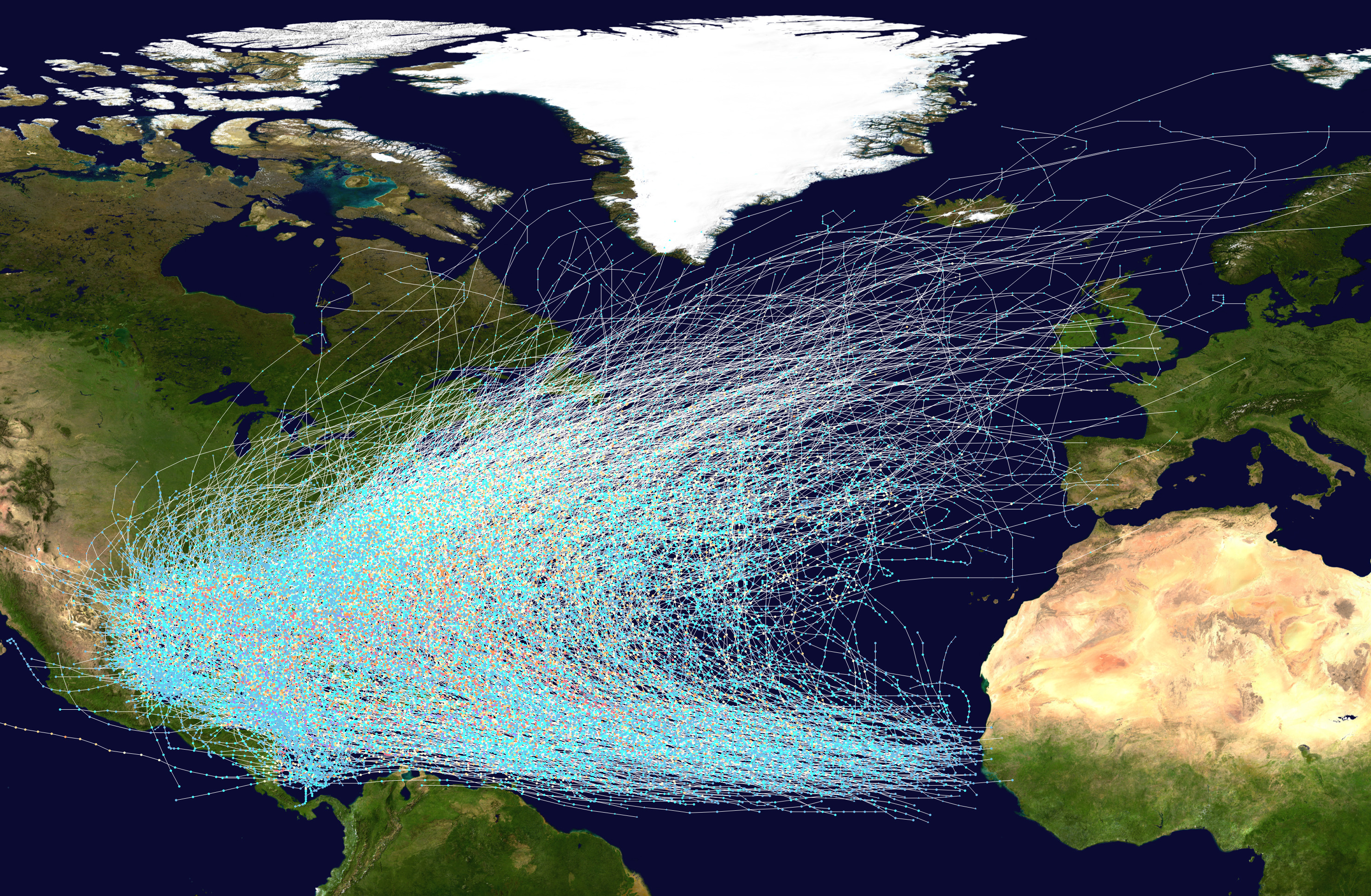
Tracks of North Atlantic tropical cyclones from 1851 to 2025

An Atlantic hurricane is a type of tropical cyclone that forms in the Atlantic Ocean primarily between June and November. These storms are continuously rotating around a low-pressure center, which causes stormy weather across a large area, which is not limited to just the eye of the storm. They are organized systems of clouds and thunderstorms that originate over tropical or subtropical waters and have closed low-level circulation.

An Atlantic tropical cyclone can be categorized by intensity. Tropical storms have one-minute maximum sustained winds of at least 39 mph (34 knots, 17 m/s, 63 km/h), while hurricanes must achieve the target of one-minute maximum sustained winds that is 75 mph or more (64 knots, 33 m/s, 119 km/h).

Until the mid-1900s, storms were named arbitrarily. The practice of naming storms from a predetermined list began in 1953. Hurricanes that result in significant damage or casualties may have their names retired from the list. On average, 14 named storms occur each season in the North Atlantic basin, with 7 becoming hurricanes and 3 becoming major hurricanes (Category 3 or greater). In April 2004, Catarina became the first storm of hurricane strength to be recorded in the South Atlantic Ocean.

== Description ==
Terminology for tropical cyclones on a world map

An Atlantic hurricane is a type of tropical cyclone that forms in the Atlantic Ocean. They occur primarily between June and November. These storms are continuously rotating around a low-pressure center, which causes stormy weather across a large area, which is not limited to just the eye of the storm. They are organized systems of clouds and thunderstorms that originate over tropical or subtropical waters and have closed low-level circulation and should not be confused with tornadoes, which are another type of cyclone. They form over low-pressure systems.

In the North Atlantic and the Eastern Pacific, the term "hurricane" is used, whereas "typhoon" is used in the Western Pacific near Asia. The more general term "cyclone" is used in the rest of the ocean basins, namely the South Pacific and Indian Ocean.

Tropical storms have one-minute maximum sustained winds of at least 39 mph (34 knots, 17 m/s, 63 km/h), while hurricanes must achieve the target of one-minute maximum sustained winds that is 75 mph or more (64 knots, 33 m/s, 119 km/h). The United States National Hurricane Center (NHC) monitors tropical weather systems for the North Atlantic Basin and issues reports, watches, and warnings; it is considered to be one of the Regional Specialized Meteorological Centers for tropical cyclones, as defined by the World Meteorological Organization.

== Steering factors ==
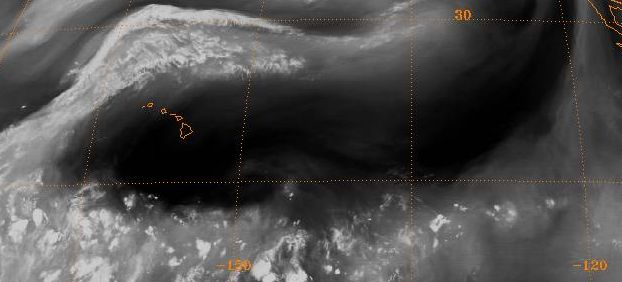
The subtropical ridge (in the Pacific) shows up as a large area of black (dryness) on this water vapor satellite image from September 2000

Tropical cyclones are steered by flows surrounding them throughout the depth of the troposphere (the atmospheric layer ranging from the ground to about eight miles (13 km) high). Neil Frank, former director of the United States National Hurricane Center, used analogies such as "a leaf carried along in a stream" or a "brick moving through a river of air" to describe the way atmospheric flow affects the path of a hurricane across the ocean. Specifically, airflow around high-pressure systems and toward low-pressure areas influences hurricane tracks.

In the tropical latitudes, tropical storms and hurricanes generally move westward with a slight tendency toward the north due to being under the influence of the subtropical ridge, a high-pressure system that usually extends east–west across the subtropics. South of the subtropical ridge, surface easterly winds (blowing from east to west) prevail. If the subtropical ridge is weakened by an upper trough, a tropical cyclone may turn poleward (north) and then recurve (curve back toward the northeast into the main belt of the westerlies). Poleward of the subtropical ridge, westerly winds prevail and generally move tropical cyclones that reach northern latitudes toward the east.

== Intensity ==
The 20-year average of the number of annual Category 4 and 5 hurricanes in the Atlantic region has approximately doubled since the year 2000.

Category 5 Atlantic hurricanes have become much more common in recent decades.

Most intense Atlantic hurricanes
Rank	Hurricane	Season	Pressure	
Rank	Hurricane	Season	hPa	inHg
1	Wilma	2005	882	26.05
2	Gilbert	1988	888	26.23
3	"Labor Day"	1935	892	26.34
3	Melissa	2025	892	26.34
5	Rita	2005	895	26.43
5	Milton	2024	895	26.43
7	Allen	1980	899	26.55
8	Camille	1969	900	26.58
9	Katrina	2005	902	26.64
10	Mitch	1998	905	26.73
10	Dean	2007	905	26.73
Source: HURDAT

Tropical cyclones can be categorized by intensity. The intensity of a tropical cyclone is generally determined by either a storm's maximum sustained winds or its lowest barometric pressure. The following table lists the most intense Atlantic hurricanes in terms of their lowest barometric pressure. In terms of wind speed, Hurricane Allen and Hurricane Melissa were the strongest Atlantic tropical cyclones on record, with maximum sustained winds of 165 knots (190 mph; 305 km/h). However, Allen's measurements are suspect, since instrumentation used to document wind speeds at the time was likely to succumb to winds of such intensity. Nonetheless, their central pressures are low enough to rank them among the strongest recorded Atlantic hurricanes.

Owing to their intensity, the strongest Atlantic hurricanes have all attained Category 5 classification. Hurricane Opal, the strongest Category 4 hurricane recorded, reached a minimum pressure of 916 hPa (27.05 inHg), a pressure typical of Category 5 hurricanes. Hurricane Wilma became the strongest Atlantic hurricane recorded after reaching an intensity of 882 mbar (26.05 inHg) in October 2005. Preceding Wilma is Hurricane Gilbert, which held the record for the most intense Atlantic hurricane for 17 years. The 1935 Labor Day hurricane, tied with Melissa, with a pressure of 892 mbar (hPa; 26.34 inHg), is the third strongest Atlantic hurricane and the strongest documented tropical cyclone before 1950. Since the measurements taken during Wilma and Gilbert were documented using dropsonde, this pressure remains the lowest measured over land.

Hurricanes Rita and Milton share the spot as the fifth strongest Atlantic hurricane on record, each with a barometric pressure reading of 895 hPa (26.43 inHg). Both hurricanes are also the strongest tropical cyclones ever recorded in the Gulf of Mexico.

Rita is one of the three tropical cyclones from 2005 on the list, with the others being Wilma and Katrina at first and ninth, respectively. Hurricanes Mitch and Dean share intensities for the tenth strongest Atlantic hurricane at 905 mbar (26.72 inHg).

Many of the strongest recorded tropical cyclones weakened before their eventual landfall or demise. However, five of the storms remained intense enough at landfall to be considered some of the strongest, most powerful landfalling hurricanes—five of the ten hurricanes on the list constitute the five most intense Atlantic landfalls in recorded history. The 1935 Labor Day hurricane made landfall at peak intensity, making it the most intense Atlantic landfall. Hurricane Melissa made landfall shortly after peak intensity with a pressure of 897 hPa, making it the second strongest. Though it weakened slightly before its eventual landfall on the Yucatán Peninsula, Hurricane Gilbert maintained a pressure of 900 hPa at landfall, as did Camille, making their landfalls tied as the third strongest. Hurricane Dean also made landfall on the peninsula, but it did so at peak intensity and with a higher barometric pressure; its landfall marked the fifth strongest in Atlantic hurricane history.

== Climatology ==
Total and Average Number of Tropical Storms by Month (1851–2017)
Month	Total	Average per year
January–April	7	<0.05
May	22	0.1
June	92	0.5
July	120	0.7
August	389	2.3
September	584	3.5
October	341	2.0
November	91	0.5
December	17	0.1
Source: NOAA FAQ

Climatology serves to characterize the general properties of an average season and can be used for making forecasts. Most storms form from tropical waves in warm waters several hundred miles north of the equator near the Intertropical Convergence Zone from tropical waves. The Coriolis force is usually too weak to initiate sufficient rotation near the equator. Storms frequently form in the waters of the Gulf of Mexico, the Caribbean, the tropical Atlantic Ocean, and in areas as far east as the Cape Verde Islands, forming Cape Verde hurricanes. Systems may also strengthen over the Gulf Stream off the coast of the eastern United States wherever water temperatures exceed 26.5 °C (79.7 °F).

Although most storms are found within tropical latitudes, occasionally storms will form further north and east due to disturbances other than tropical waves such as cold fronts and upper-level lows. These are known as baroclinically induced tropical cyclones. There is a strong correlation between the amount of Atlantic hurricane activity in the tropics and the presence of an El Niño or La Niña in the Pacific Ocean. El Niño events increase the wind shear over the Atlantic, producing a less favorable environment for formation and decreasing tropical activity in the Atlantic basin. Conversely, La Niña causes an increase in activity due to a decrease in wind shear.

According to the Azores High hypothesis by Kam-biu Liu, an anti-phase pattern is expected to exist between the Gulf of Mexico coast and the North American Atlantic coast. During the quiescent periods (3000–1400 BC and 1000 AD to present), a more northeasterly position of the Azores High would result in more hurricanes being steered toward the Atlantic coast. During the hyperactive period (1400 BC to 1000 AD), more hurricanes were steered towards the Gulf coast as the Azores High was shifted to a more southwesterly position near the Caribbean. Such a displacement of the Azores High is consistent with paleoclimatic evidence that shows an abrupt onset of a drier climate in Haiti around 3200 ^{14}C years BP, and a change towards more humid conditions in the Great Plains during the late-Holocene as more moisture was pumped up the Mississippi Valley through the Gulf coast. Preliminary data from the northern Atlantic coast seem to support the Azores High hypothesis. A 3000-year proxy record from a coastal lake in Cape Cod suggests that hurricane activity has increased significantly during the past 500–1000 years, just as the Gulf coast was amid a quiescent period of the last millennium.

=== Seasonal variation ===
Atlantic tropical storm and hurricane frequency, by month

Most North Atlantic tropical cyclones form between August 1 and November 30, when most tropical disturbances occur. Approximately 97 percent of tropical cyclones that form in the North Atlantic develop between June 1 and November 30, which delimit the modern-day Atlantic hurricane season. On average, 14 named storms occur each season in the North Atlantic basin, with 7 becoming hurricanes and 3 becoming major hurricanes (Category 3 or greater). The climatological peak of activity is typically around mid-September.

Though the beginning of the annual hurricane season has historically remained the same, the official end of the hurricane season has shifted from its initial date of October 31. Regardless, on an average of every few years, a tropical cyclone develops outside the limits of the season. As of September 2021, there have been 88 tropical cyclones in the off-season, with the most recent being Tropical Storm Ana in May 2021. The first tropical cyclone of the 1938 Atlantic hurricane season, which formed on January 3, became the earliest-forming tropical storm, as post-hurricane reanalysis concluded about the storm in December 2012. Hurricane Able in 1951 was initially thought to be the earliest forming major hurricane – a tropical cyclone with winds exceeding 115 mph (185 km/h) (Note: A major hurricane is a storm that ranks as Category 3 or higher on the Saffir–Simpson hurricane wind scale.) – however, following post-storm analysis, it was determined that Able only reached Category 1 strength, which made Hurricane Alma of 1966 the new record holder, as it became a major hurricane on June 8. Though it developed within the bounds of the Atlantic hurricane season, Hurricane Audrey in 1957 became the earliest developing Category 4 hurricane on record after it reached 115 mph on June 27. However, reanalysis from 1956 to 1960 by NOAA downgraded Audrey to a Category 3, making Hurricane Dennis of 2005 the earliest Category 4 on record on July 8, 2005. The earliest-forming Category 5 hurricane, Beryl, reached the highest intensity on the Saffir–Simpson hurricane wind scale on July 2, 2024.

Though the official end of the Atlantic hurricane season occurs on November 30, the dates of October 31 and November 15 have also historically marked the end date for the hurricane season. December, the only month of the year after the hurricane season, has featured the cyclogenesis of fourteen tropical cyclones. Tropical Storm Zeta in 2005 was the latest tropical cyclone to attain tropical storm intensity, as it did so on December 30. However, the second Hurricane Alice in 1954 was the latest forming tropical cyclone to attain hurricane intensity. Both Zeta and Alice were the only two storms to exist in two calendar years – the former from 1954 to 1955 and the latter from 2005 to 2006. No storms have been recorded to exceed Category 1 hurricane intensity in December. In 1999, Hurricane Lenny reached Category 4 intensity on November 17 as it took an unprecedented west-to-east track across the Caribbean; its intensity made it the latest developing Category 4 hurricane, though this was well within the bounds of the hurricane season. Hurricane Hattie (October 27 – November 1, 1961) was initially thought to have been the latest forming Category 5 hurricane ever documented, as was 2020's Hurricane Iota, but both were later downgraded during subsequent reanalysis. Reanalysis also indicated that a hurricane in 1932 reached Category 5 intensity later than any other hurricane on record in the Atlantic.

==== June ====
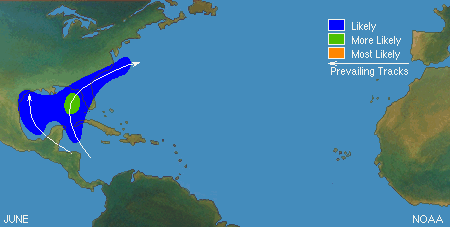
Typical locations and tracks of tropical systems in June; blue is likely, green more likely, and orange most likely

The beginning of the hurricane season is most closely related to the timing of increases in sea surface temperatures, convective instability, and other thermodynamic factors. Although June marks the beginning of the hurricane season, little activity usually occurs, with an average of one tropical cyclone every two years. During this early period in the hurricane season, tropical systems usually form in the Gulf of Mexico or off the east coast of the United States.

Since 1851, a total of 81 tropical storms and hurricanes formed in June. During this period, two of these systems developed in the deep tropics east of the Lesser Antilles. Since 1870, three major hurricanes have formed during June, such as Hurricane Audrey in 1957. Audrey attained an intensity greater than that of any Atlantic tropical cyclone during June or July until Hurricanes Dennis and Emily of 2005. The easternmost forming storm during June, Tropical Storm Bret in 2023, formed at 40.3°W.

==== July ====
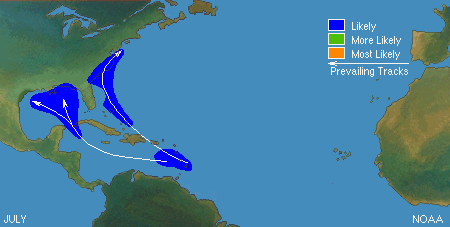
Typical locations and tracks in July

Little tropical activity occurs during July, with only one tropical cyclone usually forming. From 1944 to 1996, the first tropical storm occurred by 11 July in half of the seasons, and a second formed by 8 August.

Formation usually occurs in the eastern Caribbean around the Lesser Antilles, in the northern and eastern parts of the Gulf of Mexico, in the vicinity of the northern Bahamas, and off the coast of The Carolinas and Virginia over the Gulf Stream. Storms travel westward through the Caribbean and then either move towards the north and curve near the eastern coast of the United States or stay on a north-westward track and enter the Gulf of Mexico.

Since 1851, a total of 105 tropical storms have formed during July. Since 1870, ten of these storms reached major hurricane intensity; out of them, only Hurricane Emily of 2005 and Hurricane Beryl of 2024, attained Category 5 hurricane status. The easternmost forming storm and longest-lived during July, Hurricane Bertha in 2008, formed at 22.9°W and lasted 17 days.

==== August ====
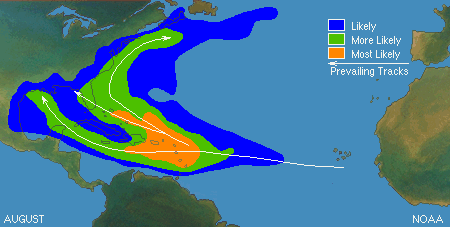
Typical locations and tracks in August

A decrease in wind shear from July to August contributes to an increase in tropical activity. An average of 2.8 Atlantic tropical storms develop annually in August. On average, four named tropical storms, including one hurricane, occur by August 30, and the first intense hurricane develops by 4 September.

==== September ====
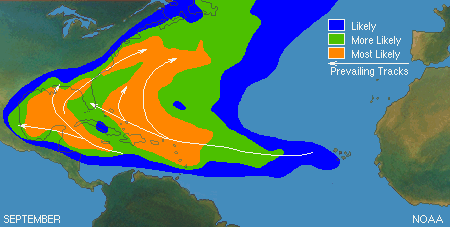
Typical locations and tracks in September

The peak of the hurricane season occurs in September and corresponds with low wind shear and the warmest sea surface temperatures. The month of September sees an average of 3 storms a year. By September 24, the average Atlantic season features 7 named tropical storms, including 4 hurricanes. In addition, two major hurricanes occur on average by 28 September. Relatively few tropical cyclones make landfall at these intensities.

==== October ====
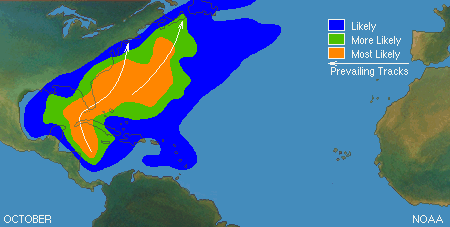
Typical locations and tracks in October.

The favorable conditions found during September begin to decay in October. The main reason for the decrease in activity is increasing wind shear, although sea surface temperatures are also cooler than in September. In October, only 1.8 cyclones develop on average, despite a climatological secondary peak around 20 October. By 21 October, the average season features 9 named storms with 5 hurricanes. A third major hurricane occurs after September 28 in half of all Atlantic tropical cyclone seasons. In contrast to mid-season activity, the mean locus of formation shifts westward to the Caribbean and Gulf of Mexico, reversing the eastward progression of June through August.

==== November ====
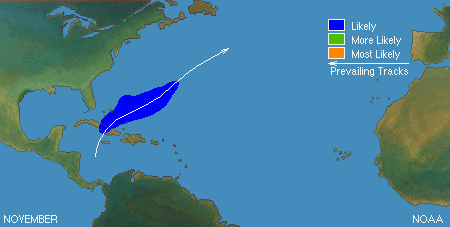
Typical locations and tracks in November.

Wind shear from the westerlies increases throughout November, generally preventing cyclone formation. On average, one tropical storm forms during every other November. On rare occasions, a major hurricane occurs. The few intense hurricanes in November include the Cuba hurricane in late October and early November 1932 (the strongest November hurricane on record, peaking as a Category 5 hurricane), Hurricane Lenny in mid-November 1999, and Hurricane Kate in late November 1985, which was the latest major hurricane formation on record until Hurricane Otto in 2016. Hurricane Eta strengthened into a Category 4 hurricane in early November 2020, becoming the third most intense tropical cyclone in November, and made landfall in Central America. In that same year, Hurricane Iota strengthened into a Category 4 hurricane on November 16, becoming the second most intense hurricane in November.

==== Off-season ====
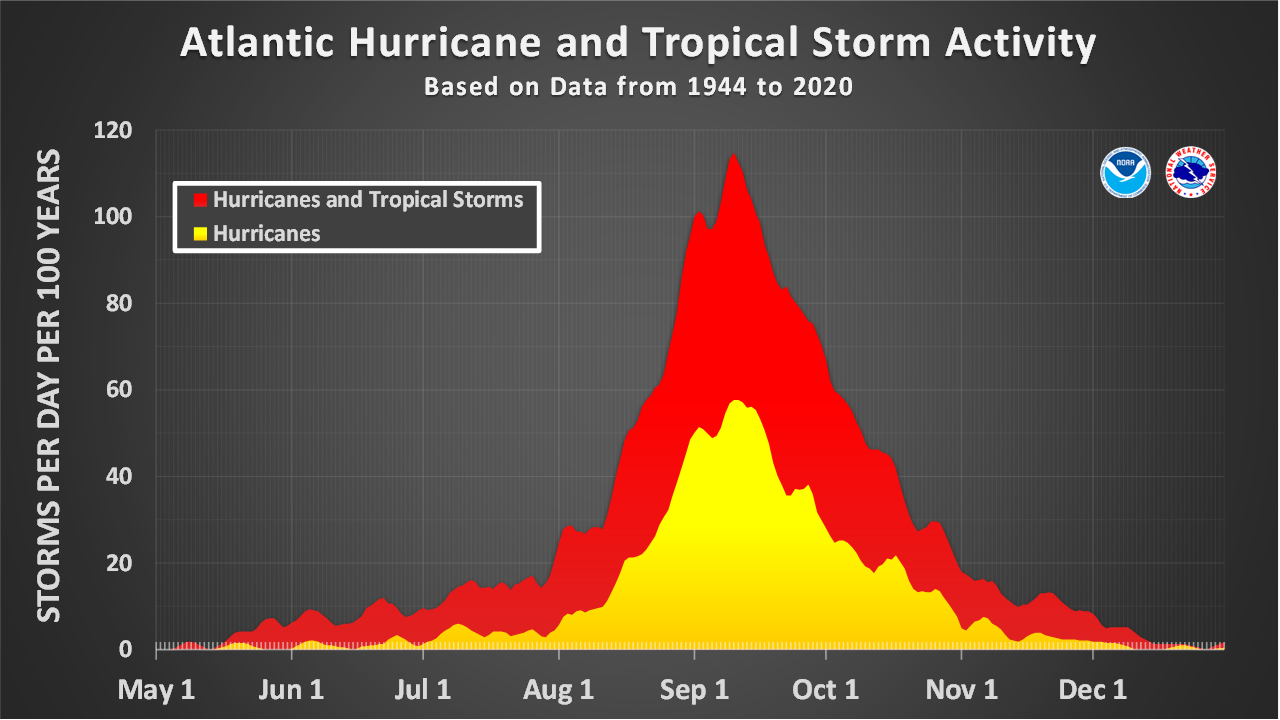
Probability of a tropical cyclone of tropical storm or hurricane strength at a specific date, expressed as systems per 100 years

Although the hurricane season is defined as beginning on June 1 and ending on November 30, tropical cyclones have formed in every month of the year. Since 1870, there have been 32 off-season cyclones, 18 of which occurred in May. In the same period, nine storms formed in December, three in April, and one each in January, February, and March. During four years (1887, 1953, 2003, and 2007), tropical cyclones formed in the North Atlantic Ocean both during or before May and during December. 1887 holds the record for being the year with the most storms outside the hurricane season, with four off-season storms having occurred during it. However, high vertical wind shear and low sea surface temperatures generally preclude tropical cyclone formation during the off-season.

Among the tropical cyclones that formed in December, the lifespan of two continued into January of the following calendar year: Hurricane Alice in 1954–55, and Tropical Storm Zeta in 2005–06. Seven tropical or subtropical cyclones formed in January, two of which became Category 1 hurricanes: the first storm of 1938, and Hurricane Alex in 2016. No major hurricanes have occurred in the off-season.

=== Monitoring ===
The United States National Hurricane Center (NHC) monitors tropical weather systems for the North Atlantic Basin and issues reports, watches, and warnings; it is considered to be one of the Regional Specialized Meteorological Centers for tropical cyclones and subtropical cyclones, as defined by the World Meteorological Organization.

== List by intensity ==
=== Category 5 ===
The most intense hurricane (by barometric pressure) on record in the North Atlantic basin was Hurricane Wilma (2005), with a minimum pressure of 882 mbar (26.0 inHg) and maximum sustained winds of 185 mph (295 km/h). The most intense hurricanes to make direct landfall were the Labor Day Hurricane of 1935 and Hurricane Melissa of 2025, both of which hit land with a sustained wind speed of 185 mph (295 km/h), with a pressure of 892 hPa and 897 hPa respecively.

=== Category 4 ===
The longest-lasting hurricane was the 1899 San Ciriaco hurricane, a Category 4 hurricane that lasted for 27 days and 18 hours as a tropical cyclone. The deadliest hurricane to make landfall on the continental United States was the 1900 Galveston hurricane, a Category 4 hurricane that may have killed up to 12,000 people.

=== Category 3 ===
The largest hurricane (in gale diameter winds) on record to form in the North Atlantic was Hurricane Sandy (2012) with a gale diameter of 870 miles (1,400 km). Sandy was a Category 3 hurricane that later transitioned into an extratropical cyclone before hitting New Jersey, causing $68.7 billion in damage.

== Extremes ==
Costliest Atlantic hurricanes

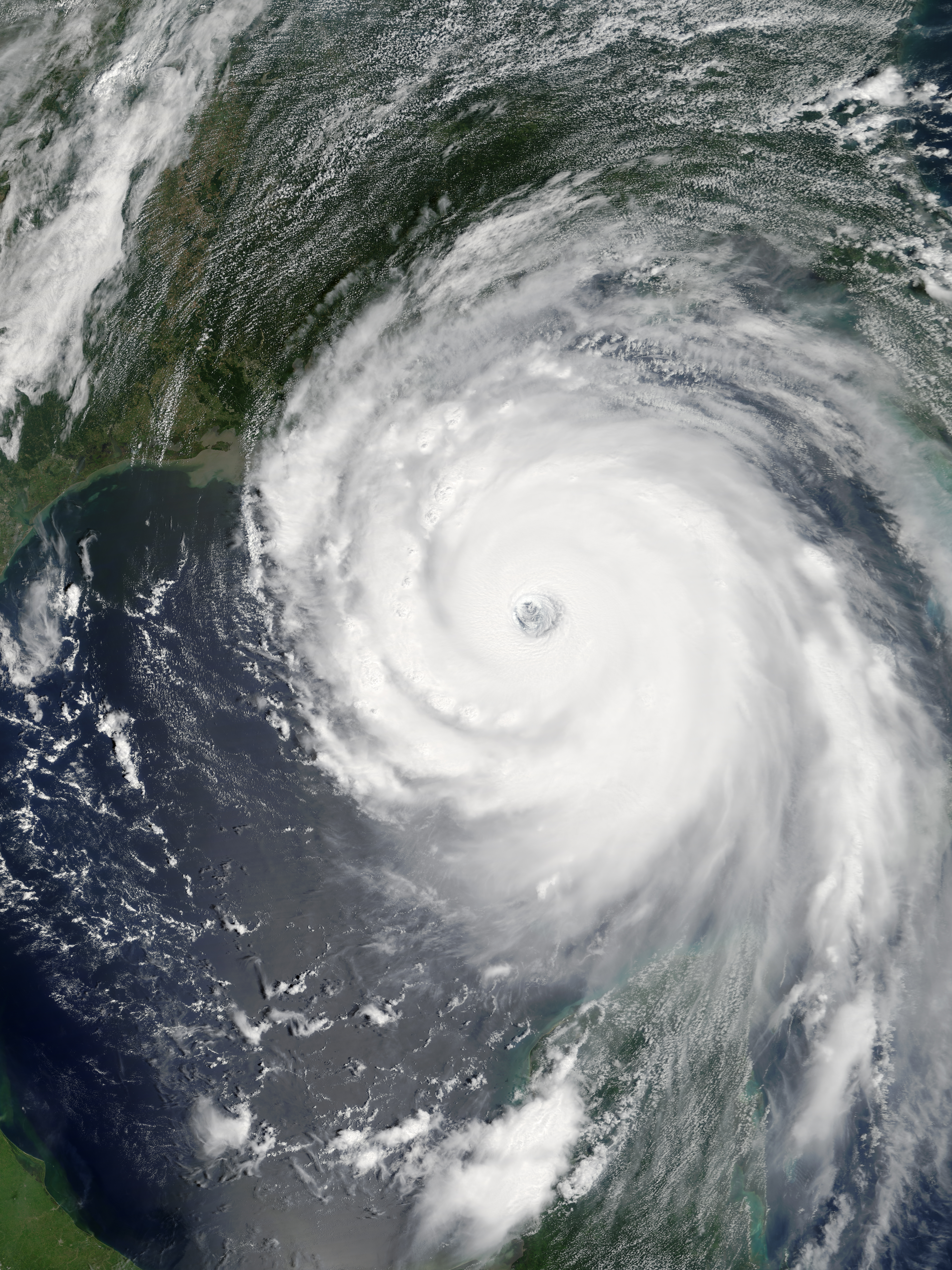
Hurricane Katrina was the costliest and one of the five deadliest hurricanes in the history of the United States.

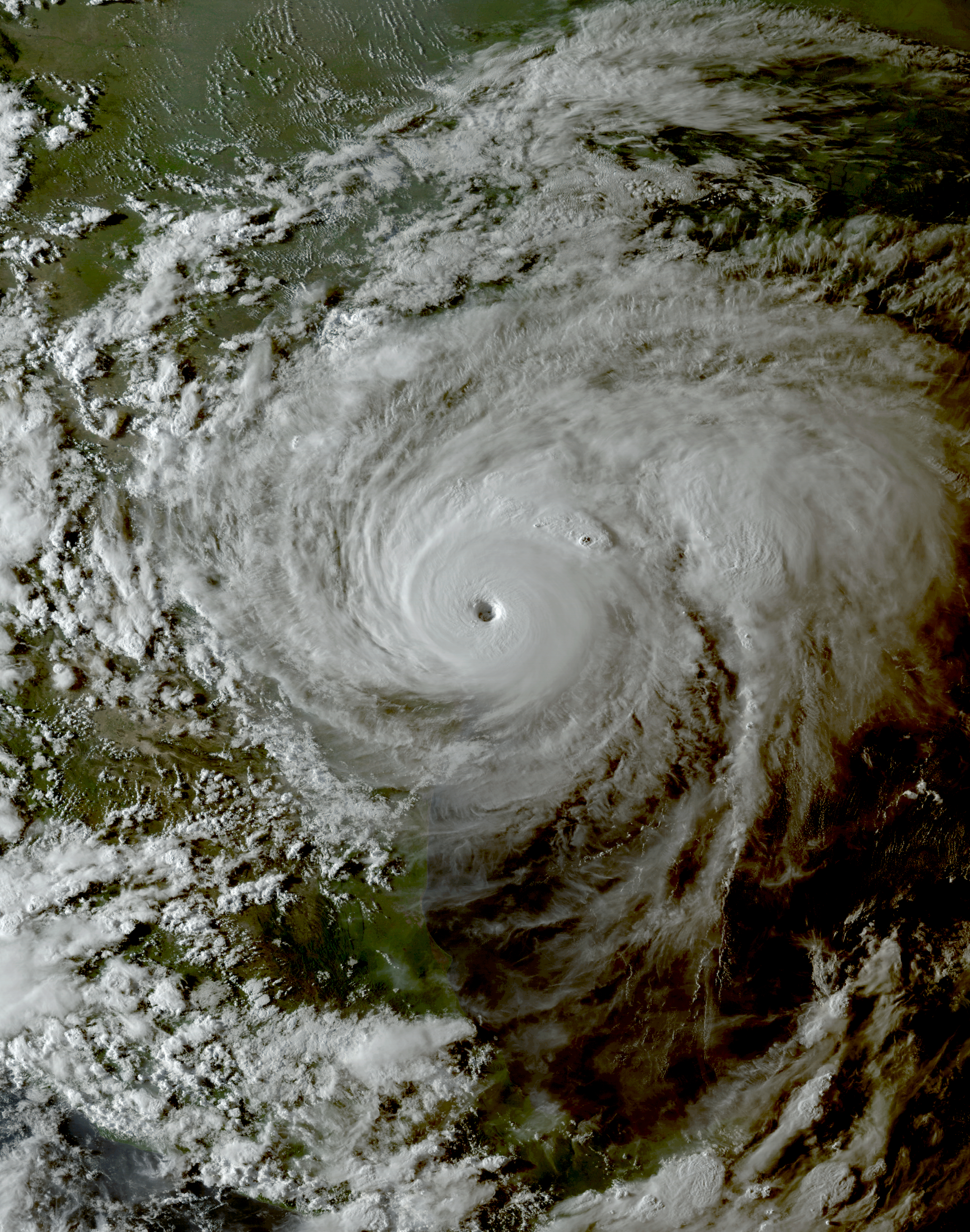
Hurricane Harvey was also the costliest hurricane in the history of the United States, causing historic and catastrophic flooding in Texas.

- The season in which the most tropical storms formed on record is the 2020 Atlantic hurricane season, which produced 30 storms. However, 2005 was the one in which the most hurricanes formed on record (15).
- The 2005 Atlantic hurricane season had the most major hurricanes on record (7), also tied with 2020. The 1950 Atlantic hurricane season and 1961 Atlantic hurricane season were once thought to have 8 and 7 respectively, but re-analysis showed that several storms during both seasons were weaker than thought, and thus the records are now held by the 2005 and 2020 seasons. Some storms in 2005 were Hurricane Katrina and Hurricane Wilma.
- The least active season on record since 1946 (when the database is considered more reliable) was the 1983 Atlantic hurricane season, with four tropical storms, two hurricanes, and one major hurricane. Overall, the 1914 Atlantic hurricane season remains the least active, with only one documented storm.
- The most tornadoes spawned by a hurricane were 127 created by Hurricane Ivan (2004 season).
- The deadliest hurricane was the Great Hurricane of 1780 (22,000 fatalities).
- The most damaging hurricanes were Hurricane Katrina and Hurricane Harvey of the 2005 and 2017 seasons, respectively; both caused $125 billion in damages in their respective years. However, when adjusted for inflation, Katrina is the costliest, with $161 billion in damages.
- The quickest-forming hurricane was Hurricane Humberto in 2007. It was a small hurricane that formed and intensified faster than any other tropical cyclone on record before landfall. Developing on September 12, 2007, in the northwestern Gulf of Mexico, the cyclone strengthened and struck High Island, Texas, with winds of about 90 mph (145 km/h) early on September 13.
- In April 2004, Catarina became the first storm of hurricane strength to be recorded in the South Atlantic Ocean. Since 2011, the Brazilian Navy Hydrographic Center has started to use the same scale as the North Atlantic Ocean for tropical cyclones in the South Atlantic Ocean and assign names to those that reach 35 kn (65 km/h; 40 mph).

== Trends ==
Atlantic accumulated cyclone energy (ACE) index from NOAA.

Atlantic Multidecadal Oscillation Timeseries, 1856–2013

=== Paleoclimatology and historical trends ===
Proxy records based on paleotempestological research have revealed that major hurricane activity along the Gulf Coast varies on timescales of centuries to millennia. A few major hurricanes struck the Gulf Coast during 3000–1400 BC and during the most recent millennium. These quiescent intervals were separated by a hyperactive period between 1400 BC and 1000 AD, when the Gulf coast was struck frequently by hurricanes; their landfall probabilities increased by 3–5 times. This millennial-scale variability has been attributed to long-term shifts in the position of the Azores High, which may also be linked to changes in the strength of the North Atlantic Oscillation.

According to the Azores High hypothesis, an anti-phase pattern is expected to exist between the Gulf Coast and the Atlantic coast. During the quiescent periods, a more northeasterly position of the Azores High would result in more hurricanes being steered towards the Atlantic coast. During the hyperactive period, more hurricanes were steered towards the Gulf coast, as the Azores High was shifted to a more southwesterly position near the Caribbean. Such a displacement of the Azores High is consistent with paleoclimatic evidence that shows an abrupt onset of a drier climate in Haiti around 3200 ^{14}C years BP, and a change towards more humid conditions in the Great Plains during the late-Holocene as more moisture was pumped up the Mississippi Valley through the Gulf coast. Preliminary data from the northern Atlantic coast seem to support the Azores High hypothesis. A 3,000-year proxy record from a coastal lake in Cape Cod suggests that hurricane activity increased significantly during the past 500–1000 years, just as the Gulf Coast was amid a quiescent period during the last millennium. Evidence also shows that the average latitude of hurricane impacts has been steadily shifting northward towards the Eastern Seaboard over the past few centuries. This change has been sped up in modern times due to the Arctic Ocean heating up, especially from fossil fuel-caused climate change.

The number and strength of Atlantic hurricanes may undergo a 50–70 year cycle known as the Atlantic Multidecadal Oscillation. Nyberg et al. reconstructed Atlantic major hurricane activity back to the early eighteenth century and found five periods averaging 3–5 major hurricanes per year and lasting 40–60 years, and six others averaging 1.5–2.5 major hurricanes per year and lasting 10–20 years. These periods are associated with the Atlantic multidecadal oscillation. Throughout the periods, a decadal oscillation related to solar irradiance was responsible for enhancing or dampening the number of major hurricanes by 1–2 per year.

=== Climate change ===
Between 1979 and 2019, the intensity of tropical cyclones increased; globally, tropical cyclones are 8% more likely to reach major intensities (Saffir–Simpson Categories 3 to 5). This trend is particularly strong in the North Atlantic, where the probability of cyclones reaching Category 3 or higher increased by 49% per decade. This is consistent with the theoretical understanding of the link between climate change and tropical cyclones and model studies.

While the number of storms in the Atlantic has increased since 1995, there is no obvious global trend. The annual number of tropical cyclones worldwide remains about 87 ± 10. However, the ability of climatologists to make long-term data analyses in certain basins is limited by the lack of reliable historical data in some basins, primarily in the Southern Hemisphere.

It has been observed that a poleward migration exists for the paths of maximum intensity of tropical cyclone activity in the Atlantic, as shown by research on the latitudes at which recent tropical cyclones in the Atlantic are reaching maximum intensity. The data indicates that during the past thirty years, the peak intensity of these storms has shifted poleward in both hemispheres at a rate of approximately 60 km per decade, amounting to approximately one degree of latitude per decade.

=== Impact ===
The number of $1 billion Atlantic hurricanes almost doubled from the 1980s to the 2010s, and inflation-adjusted costs have increased more than elevenfold. The increases have been attributed to climate change and to greater numbers of people moving to coastal areas.

Though large hurricane size does not imply strength—which is based on sustained wind measurements—it can mean that more people are exposed to its hazards.

Atlantic storms are becoming more financially destructive, since five of the ten most expensive storms in United States history have occurred since 1990. According to the World Meteorological Organization, a "recent increase in societal impact from tropical cyclones has largely been caused by rising concentrations of population and infrastructure in coastal regions." Pielke et al. (2008) normalized mainland U.S. hurricane damage from 1900–2005 to 2005 values and found no remaining trend of increasing absolute damage. The 1970s and 1980s had low amounts of damage compared to other decades. The decade 1996–2005 has the second most damage among the past 11 decades, with only the decade of 1926–1935 surpassing its costs. The most damaging single storm is the 1926 Miami hurricane, with $157 billion of normalized damage.

Partially because of the threat of hurricanes, some coastal regions had sparse populations between major ports until the advent of automobile tourism; therefore, the most severe portions of hurricanes striking the coast may have gone unmeasured in some instances. The combined effects of ship destruction and remote landfall limit the number of intense hurricanes in the official record before the era of hurricane reconnaissance aircraft and satellite meteorology. However, the record shows a distinct increase in the number and strength of intense hurricanes; therefore, experts regard the early data as suspect. Christopher Landsea et al. estimated an undercount bias of zero to six tropical cyclones per year between 1851 and 1885 and zero to four per year between 1886 and 1910. These undercounts roughly take into account the typical size of tropical cyclones, the density of shipping tracks over the Atlantic basin, and the amount of populated coastline.

Few above-normal hurricane seasons occurred from 1970 to 1994, and even less have occurred since 1995. Destructive hurricanes struck frequently from 1926 to 1960, especially in New England. In 1933, twenty-one Atlantic tropical storms formed; the only years with more of them were 2005 and 2020, which saw 28 and 30 storms, respectively. Tropical hurricanes occurred infrequently during the seasons of 1900–25; however, many intense storms formed during 1870–99. During the 1887 season, 19 tropical storms formed, of which a record 4 occurred after November 1; 11 of the storms strengthened into hurricanes. Few hurricanes occurred from the 1840s to 1860s; however, many struck in the early 19th century, including an 1821 storm that made landfall over New York City. Some historical weather experts say these storms may have been as high as Category 4 in strength.

These active hurricane seasons predated satellite coverage of the Atlantic basin. Before the satellite era began in 1960, tropical storms or hurricanes went undetected, unless a reconnaissance aircraft encountered one, a ship reported a voyage through the storm, or a storm landed in a populated area. The official record, therefore, may lack mentions of storms in which no ship experienced gale-force winds, recognized it as a tropical storm (as opposed to a high-latitude extra-tropical cyclone, a tropical wave, or a brief squall), returned to port, and reported the experience.

== Names ==
Until the mid-1900s, storms were named arbitrarily. From that period on, they were exclusively given feminine names, until 1979, when storms began being given both male and female names. The practice of naming storms from a predetermined list began in 1953. Since storm names may be used repeatedly, hurricanes that result in significant damage or casualties may have their names retired from the list at the request of the affected nations to prevent confusion. On average, 14 named storms occur each season in the North Atlantic basin, with 7 becoming hurricanes and 3 becoming major hurricanes (Category 3 or greater).

== See also ==
- 2026 Atlantic hurricane season
- Hebert Box
- Lists of Atlantic hurricanes
- List of Atlantic hurricane records
- List of historical tropical cyclone names
- Mediterranean tropical cyclone
- Pacific hurricane
- Project Stormfury
- Saharan air layer - dust blown from Africa that mitigates Atlantic hurricane formation
