= Hurricane Alice (December 1954) =

Category 1 Atlantic hurricane in 1954 and 1955

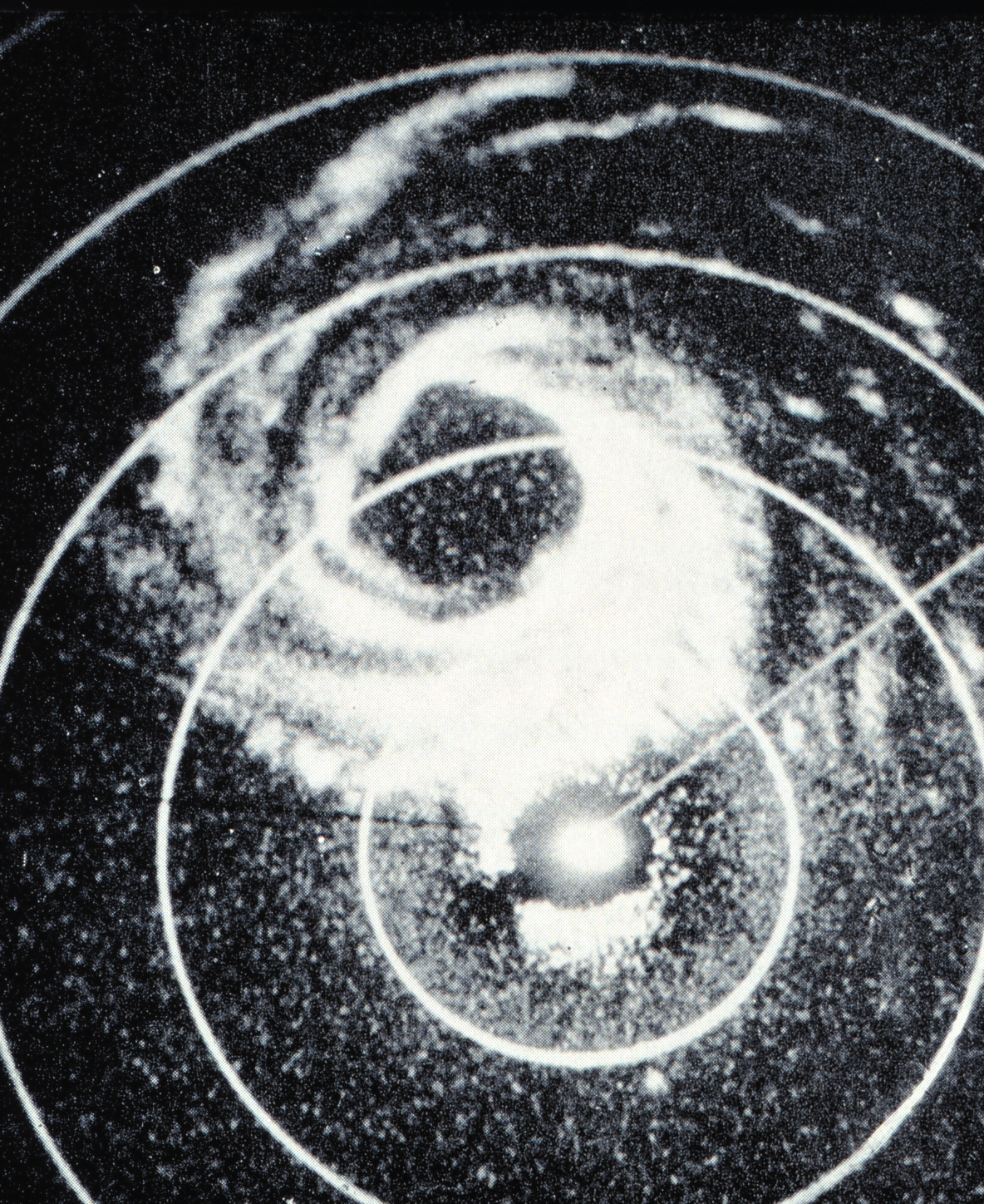
- A radar image of Hurricane Alice after peak intensity

Meteorological history
- Formed: December 30, 1954
- Dissipated: January 6, 1955

Category 1 hurricane
- 1-minute sustained (SSHWS/NWS)
- Highest winds: 90 mph (150 km/h)
- Lowest pressure: 980 mbar (hPa); 28.94 inHg

Overall effects
- Fatalities: None
- Damage: $623,000 (1954 USD)
- Areas affected: Lesser Antilles
- IBTrACS
- Part of the 1954 Atlantic hurricane season

Hurricane Alice is the only known Atlantic hurricane to span two calendar years and one of only two named Atlantic tropical cyclones, along with Tropical Storm Zeta of 2005, to do so. The twelfth tropical cyclone and the eighth hurricane of the 1954 Atlantic hurricane season, Alice developed on December 30, 1954, from a trough of low pressure in the central Atlantic Ocean in an area of unusually favorable conditions. The storm moved southwestward and gradually strengthened to reach hurricane status. After passing through the Leeward Islands on January 2, 1955, Alice reached peak winds of 90 mph (140 km/h) before encountering cold air and turning to the southeast. It dissipated on January 6 over the southeastern Caribbean Sea.

Alice produced heavy rainfall and moderately strong winds across several islands along its path. Saba and Anguilla were affected the most, with total damage amounting to $623,500 in 1955 USD (greater than $6,500,000 in 2022 USD). There was an earlier hurricane named Alice in the season. Operationally, lack of definitive data prevented the U.S. Weather Bureau from declaring the system a hurricane until January 2. It received the name Alice in early 1955, though re-analysis of the data supported extending its track to the previous year, resulting in two tropical cyclones of the same name in one season.

== Meteorological history ==
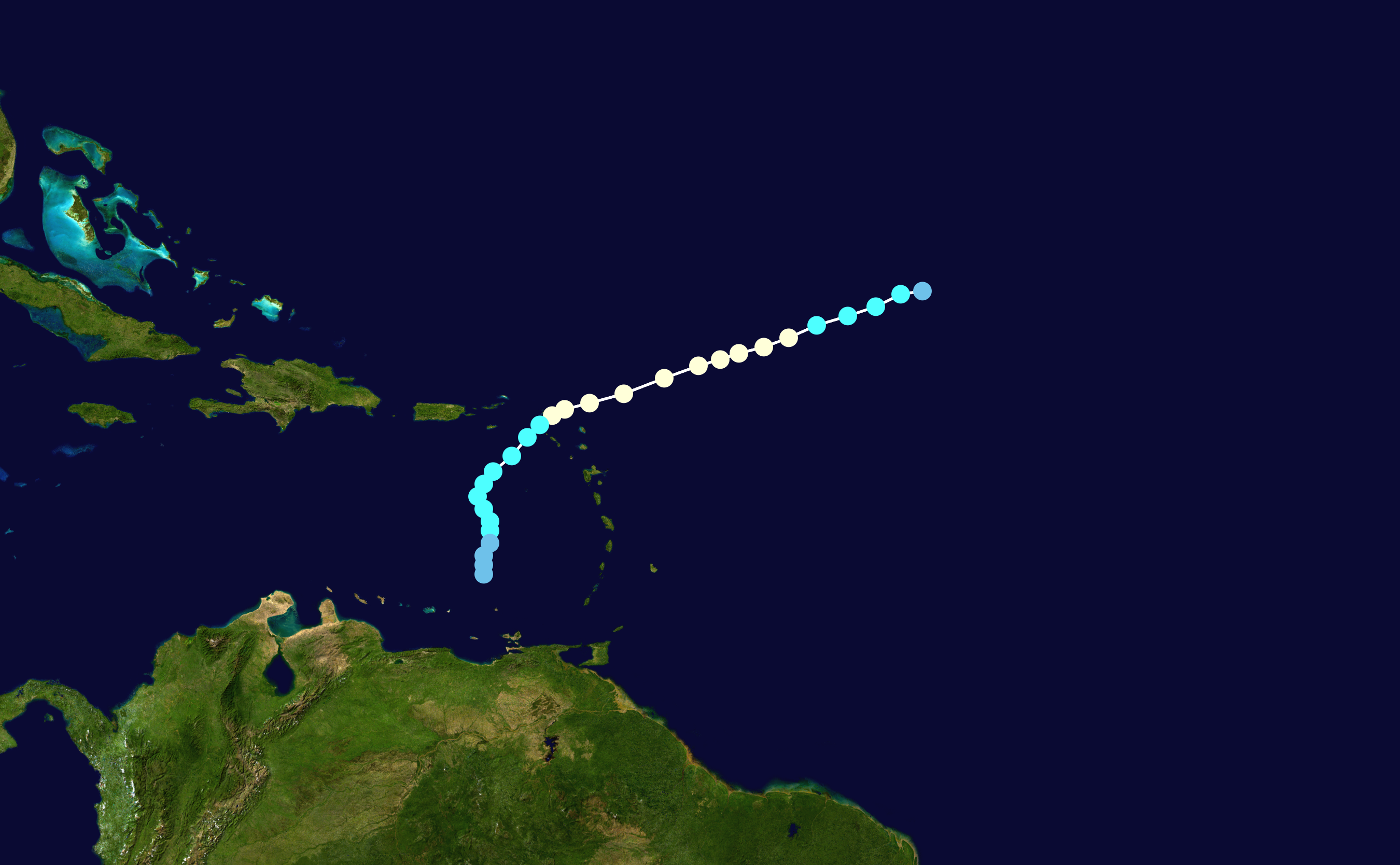
Map plotting the storm's track and intensity, according to the Saffir–Simpson scale Map key Saffir–Simpson scale Tropical depression (≤38 mph, ≤62 km/h) Tropical storm (39–73 mph, 63–118 km/h) Category 1 (74–95 mph, 119–153 km/h) Category 2 (96–110 mph, 154–177 km/h) Category 3 (111–129 mph, 178–208 km/h) Category 4 (130–156 mph, 209–251 km/h) Category 5 (≥157 mph, ≥252 km/h) Unknown Storm type Tropical cyclone Subtropical cyclone Extratropical cyclone, remnant low, tropical disturbance, or monsoon depression

A cold front moved southeastward from the East Coast of the United States on December 23, 1954, and passed over Bermuda two days later. A strong anticyclone developed behind the cold front, and on December 26 a trough extended southward from the cold front. The anticyclone moved southeastward as the trough and cold front moved eastward. The trough gradually decelerated as high pressures altered the upper level flow to that of an easterly flow. Convection increased over the trough as it moved over relatively warm waters, about 1 °C (1.8 °F) above normal, and began undergoing tropical cyclogenesis after a circulation began to develop along the northern portion of the trough. The system continued to organize as it moved to the west, and based on three ship reports confirming a closed circulation, it is estimated the system developed into a tropical depression on December 30 while located 770 miles (1,240 km) east-northeast of Barbuda in the Lesser Antilles, though operationally, the system was believed to have become a tropical depression on December 31.

With a narrow ridge of high pressure to its north, the depression moved west-southwestward. Atmospheric conditions were unusually favorable for the time of the year due to the ridge of high pressure preventing cold air from reaching the central Atlantic Ocean. This allowed the depression to intensify into a tropical storm later on December 30, based on direct observations. There were few direct observations for the following days, but it is estimated the storm intensified into a hurricane on December 31 while located about 475 miles (764 km) east-northeast of Barbuda. On January 1, 1955, a ship within 10 miles (16 km) of the center reported hurricane-force winds and a pressure of 987 mbar (29.15 inHg). Based on this report and several other ship reports, the system was recognized as a tropical low by the San Juan Weather Bureau Office. The hurricane continued to the southwest, and entered the Caribbean Sea on January 2 after passing between Saint Martin and Saint Barthélemy. A portion of the eyewall moved over Saint Martin and Saba. Based on near-hurricane-force winds from the affected islands, an information bulletin named the system as Hurricane Alice while in the northeastern Caribbean Sea. Throughout its track, Alice was a small tropical cyclone with a diameter of only around 60 miles (97 km).

Reconnaissance aircraft flew into Hurricane Alice on January 3 and confirmed the existence of the tropical cyclone by reporting winds between 60 and 65 mph (97 and 105 km/h) and a warm core center. It is estimated Alice continued to intensify as it tracked southwestward in the Caribbean Sea, and attained peak winds of 80 mph (130 km/h) while located about 95 miles (153 km) west-northwest of Montserrat. While near its peak the hurricane developed a ring of convection around its eye, and Alice maintained peak winds for about 24 hours until cold air from the north weakened it. Extratropical cyclogenesis occurred north of Bermuda on January 3, which weakened the high pressure system to the north of Alice and turned the flow in the Caribbean Sea to that of cold northwesterly winds. Alice turned to the southeast on January 4 and weakened to a tropical storm shortly thereafter. Convection gradually became disorganized, and after weakening to a tropical depression on January 5, Alice dissipated on January 6 while located about 100 miles (160 km) west-northwest of Grenada.

== Impact, naming and records ==
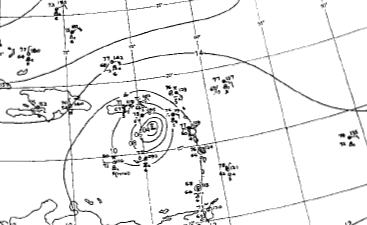
Surface weather analysis of Hurricane Alice on January 3, 1955

Subsequent to the confirmation of the existence of Hurricane Alice, the U.S. Weather Bureau Office in San Juan, Puerto Rico warned the islands of the northern Lesser Antilles to prepare for strong winds and rough seas. Hurricane Alice produced moderate to strong winds across the islands, peaking at 81 mph (130 km/h) in Saint Barthélemy and 75 mph (121 km/h) in Saba. The hurricane dropped moderate to heavy rainfall across several islands, including a peak of 11.27 inches (286 mm) in 48 hours recorded at Saba. Due to its small size, only a few islands received significant effects from the hurricane. Saint-Barthélemy, Saba, Anguilla, Sint Eustatius, and Saint Kitts reported damage from the hurricane, totaling $623,500 (1955 USD, $4.7 million 2006 USD). Damage was heaviest on Saba and Anguilla, occurring primarily to shipping facilities and crops. 626 houses were destroyed or severely damaged on Anguilla, as well. The damage was caused mostly by heavy rainfall and rough seas, not the direct action of the wind. The passage of Hurricane Alice greatly troubled the economies of the small affected islands. Additionally, the outer rainbands of the storm alleviated dry conditions on Puerto Rico which had persisted since the previous October. No deaths were reported.

This storm formed on December 30; however, in the days before satellites, meteorologists had to rely on reports from ships and islands in the Atlantic to locate and track storms. This information was often sketchy; two cyclones, including a Category 2 hurricane, operationally went undetected in 1954. It was officially recognized as a significant tropical cyclone on January 2, 1955. At the time, the National Weather Service used the same naming list each year, so the name given to this storm was "Alice" and it was designated as a part of the 1955 Atlantic hurricane season. However, it was found during post-storm analysis that the storm had actually formed on December 30, and was instead a part of the 1954 season. Therefore, the season had two storms named "Alice" — the first storm of the season, and the last. Had Alice been discovered before the end of the calendar year, it would have been named Irene, the next name on the 1954 list. Some reports named this storm Alice2 to avoid confusion with the earlier Alice from June 1954.

Alice formed later in the calendar year than any Atlantic tropical cyclone on record, forming six hours later in the season than Tropical Storm Zeta in 2005. Alice was one of only eight Atlantic tropical cyclones to form in the month of December. Alice was the first of two Atlantic tropical cyclones to exist in two calendar years, the other being 2005's Zeta. The hurricane was also one of only six tropical or subtropical cyclones to exist in the month of January, with the most recent being an unnamed subtropical cyclone in 2023.

== See also ==
- List of Category 1 Atlantic hurricanes
- List of off-season Atlantic hurricanes
