= Tropical Storm Zeta =

2005–2006 Atlantic tropical storm

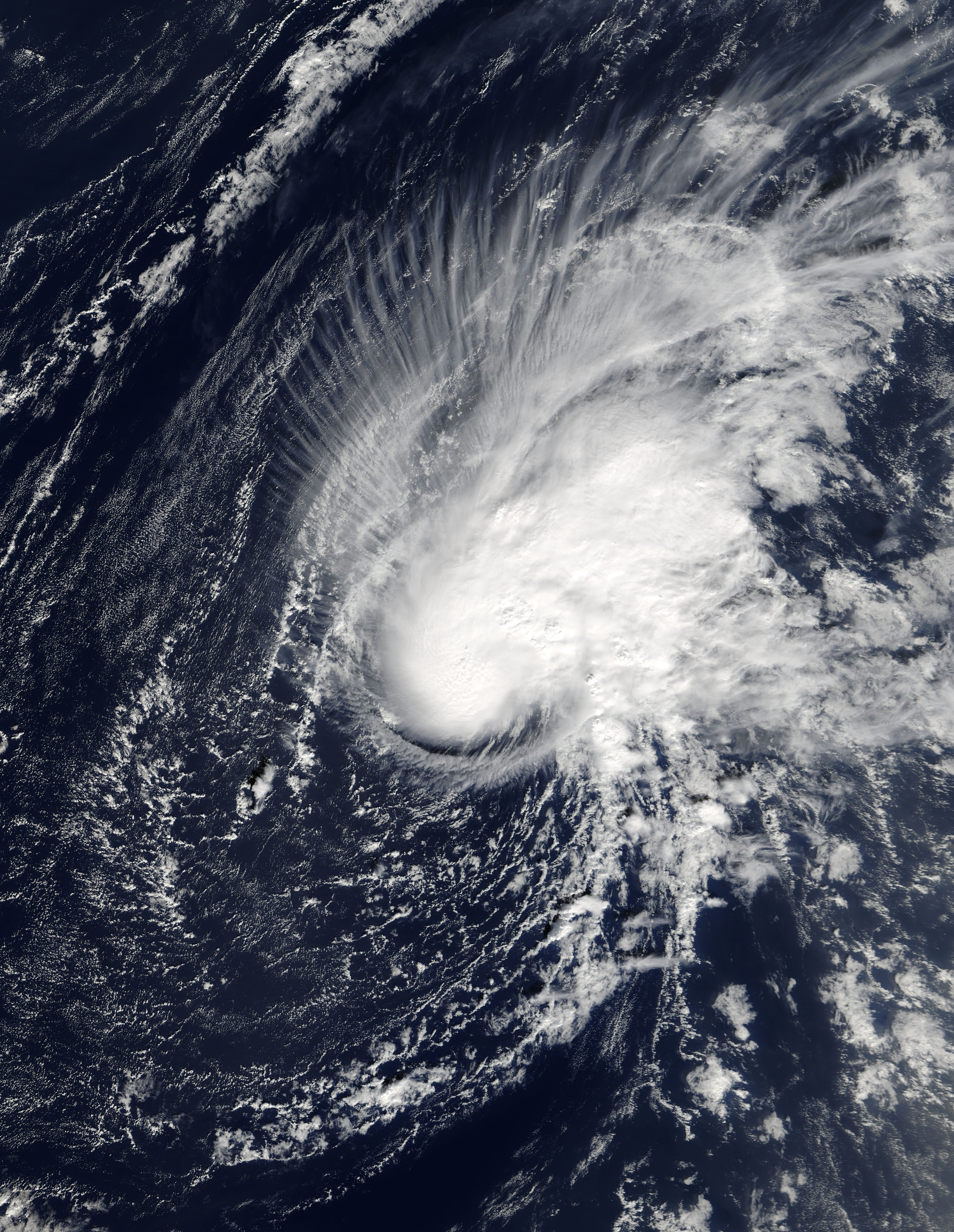
- Tropical Storm Zeta at peak intensity in the open Atlantic on January 3

Meteorological history
- Formed: December 30, 2005
- Remnant low: January 6, 2006
- Dissipated: January 7, 2006

Tropical storm
- 1-minute sustained (SSHWS/NWS)
- Highest winds: 65 mph (100 km/h)
- Lowest pressure: 994 mbar (hPa); 29.35 inHg

Overall effects
- Fatalities: None
- Damage: None reported
- Areas affected: None
- IBTrACS
- Part of the 2005 Atlantic hurricane season

Tropical Storm Zeta was a very late-developing tropical storm that formed in the central Atlantic Ocean during the 2005 Atlantic hurricane season, forming one month after the season's official end. Becoming a tropical depression on December 30, and intensifying the following day into the season's 28th storm (including one unnamed subtropical storm), Zeta continued into January 2006. It was one of only two Atlantic tropical cyclones to span two calendar years (the other being Hurricane Alice in 1954–55).

Zeta originated from an area of low pressure on December 29, which previously developed within an upper-level trough. After becoming a tropical storm, Zeta remained organized, defying predictions of a quick demise, and even grew slightly more intense. The storm reached its peak strength on January 2, 2006, before degenerating into a remnant low on January 6 and dissipating on the next day. Several ships encountered the storm, and several crews in the 2005 Woodvale Atlantic Rowing Race were affected by rough seas and high winds. Even so, as no land areas were threatened by Zeta, the NHC did not issue any tropical storm watches or warnings.

== Meteorological history ==
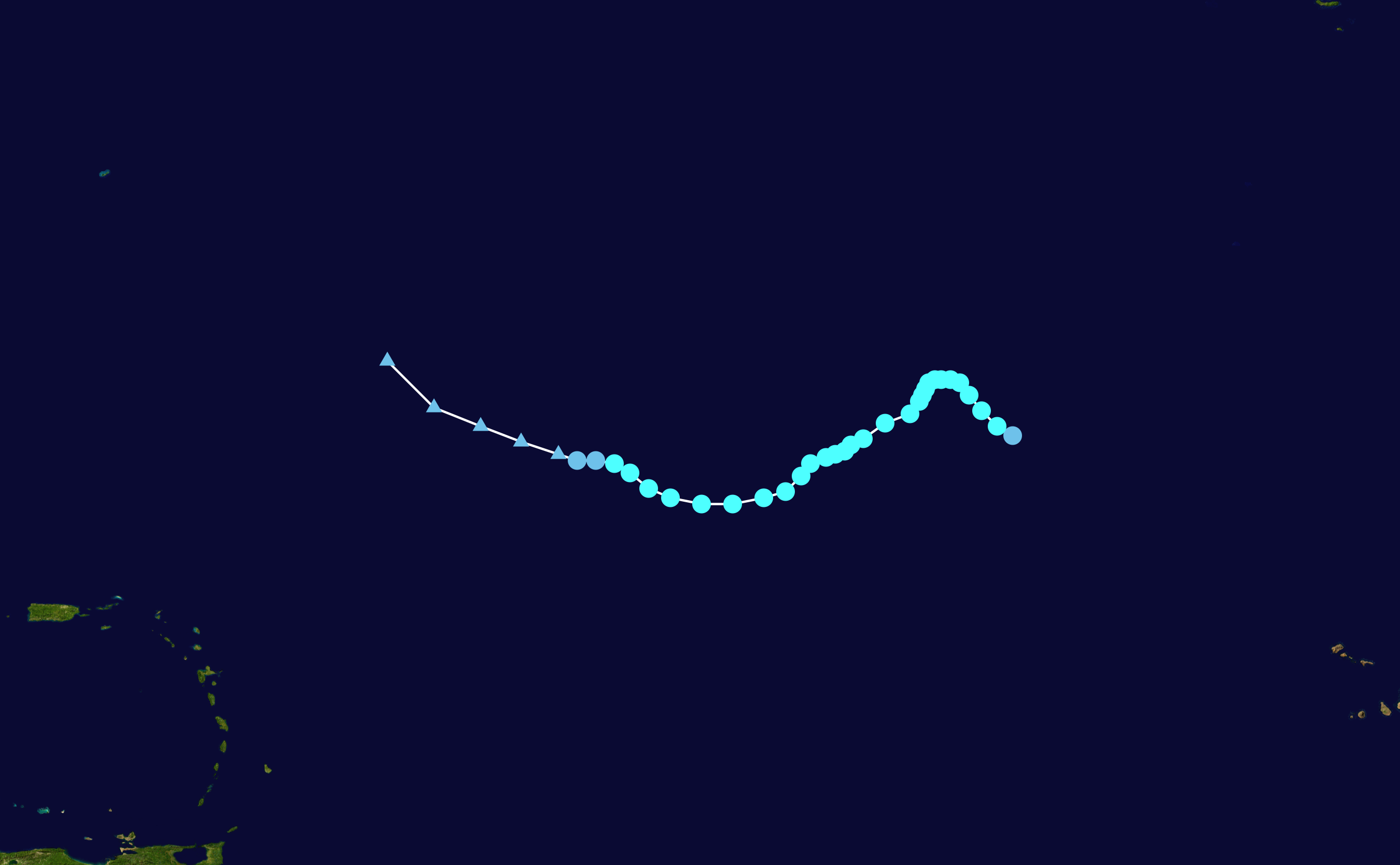
Map plotting the storm's track and intensity, according to the Saffir–Simpson scale Map key Saffir–Simpson scale Tropical depression (≤38 mph, ≤62 km/h) Tropical storm (39–73 mph, 63–118 km/h) Category 1 (74–95 mph, 119–153 km/h) Category 2 (96–110 mph, 154–177 km/h) Category 3 (111–129 mph, 178–208 km/h) Category 4 (130–156 mph, 209–251 km/h) Category 5 (≥157 mph, ≥252 km/h) Unknown Storm type Tropical cyclone Subtropical cyclone Extratropical cyclone, remnant low, tropical disturbance, or monsoon depression

Tropical Storm Zeta originated from an upper-level trough that interacted with a weakening frontal system in late-December 2005. By December 28, the trough had developed into a low pressure area roughly 750 mi (1,210 km) west-northwest of the Cape Verde Islands. The following day, a low-level circulation developed and convective activity began to increase around the low. By December 30, sufficient shower and thunderstorm activity had developed for the National Hurricane Center (NHC) to classify it as a tropical cyclone, Tropical Depression 31. Over the following several hours, convective banding developed around the storm's center and by 0600 UTC, the depression intensified into Tropical Storm Zeta, the record 28th tropical or subtropical cyclone to form during the 2005 Atlantic hurricane season. Operationally, however, the NHC did not begin issuing advisories on Zeta until 1700 UTC. Traveling slowly northwestward in response to a mid-level low to the southwest, the storm gradually intensified in a region of favorable anticyclonic outflow. By the afternoon of December 30, dry air caused the system to become slightly disorganized and led forecasters to anticipate further weakening of the storm, with Zeta forecast to begin dissipating in 36 hours and become a remnant low 12 hours later. In addition, there was evidence of some westerly wind shear beginning to impinge on the system at the time.

Early on the next day, wind shear began affecting Zeta even more, with much of the convection east of the circulation center. However, the circulation remained tight and well-defined, and the storm maintained its intensity. A few hours later, a deep burst of convection over the low-level circulation center allowed the storm to intensify a bit, with a central dense overcast forming. The Geophysical Fluid Dynamics Laboratory (GFDL) model also began to forecast Zeta to become a hurricane, but forecasters found this unlikely to occur. A mid-level ridge to the north caused Zeta turn westward before nearly stalling due to upper-level westerlies. An eye-like feature was briefly present, and the storm attained its initial peak intensity of 60 mph (95 km/h). Soon after, increasing wind shear caused convection to become disorganized, resulting in a brief weakening period.

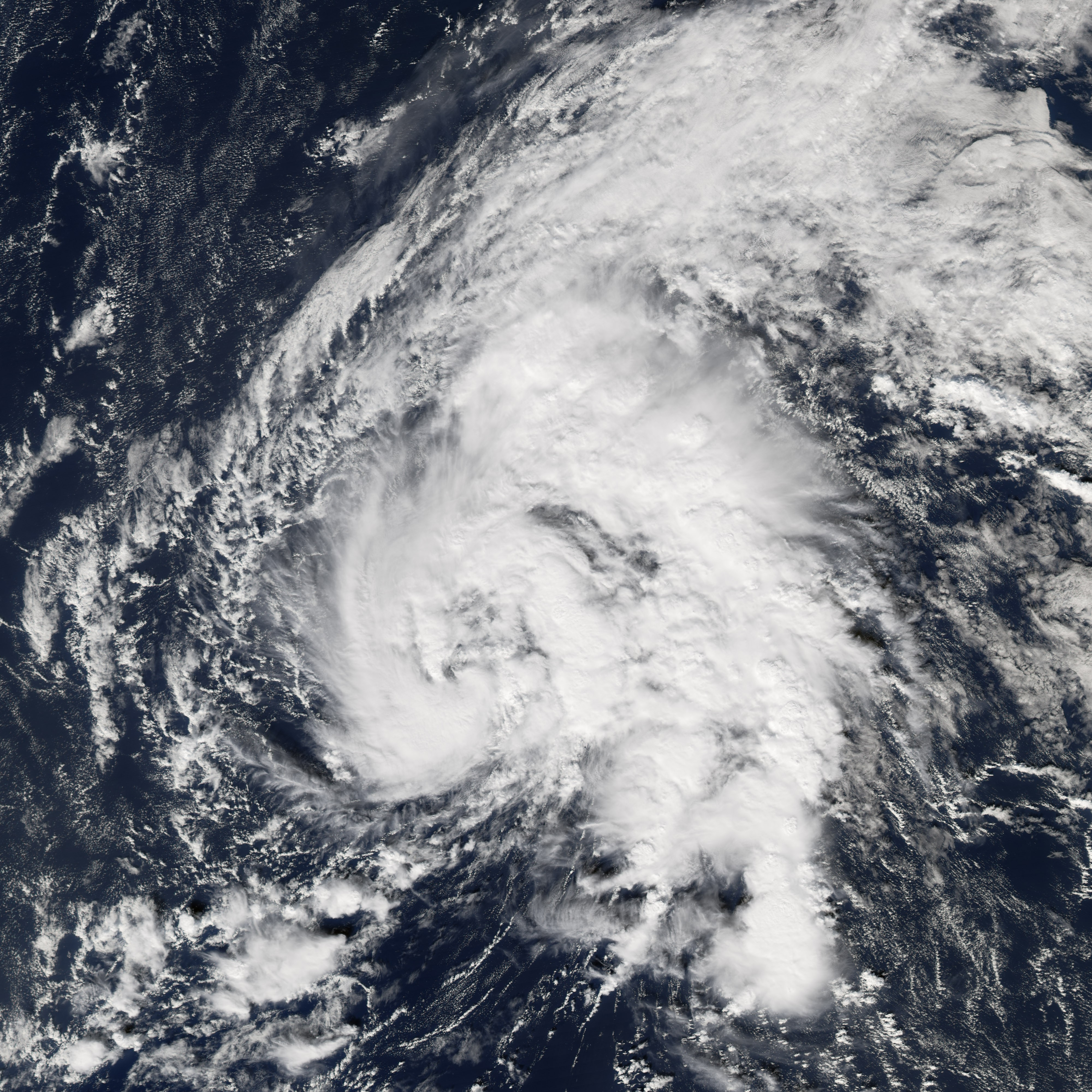
Tropical Storm Zeta shortly after being named on December 30

On January 1, 2006, Zeta began re-organizing despite high shear, with outflow of the system becoming less restricted and the cloud pattern more symmetric. Forecaster Lixion Avila stated it felt like "previous tropical cyclone Epsilon all over again" as the storm refused to weaken despite guidance insisting it would, but having (similar to Epsilon) cooler upper-atmospheric temperatures being the only thing favoring intensification. As a result he had "no choice but to forecast weakening again and again." Bursts of convection continued to keep the storm alive in the face of moderate upper-level wind shear. On January 2, Zeta began to gradually intensify "against all odds and forecasts". Convection remained over the center, and the storm's outflow expanded as well. Forecaster Avila praised the GFDL model for being the only one to not forecast weakening, but hesitated to follow it based on the GFDL insisting on it becoming a hurricane and the "approaching hostile environment forecast[ed] by every other model." Around 0000 UTC on January 3, Zeta attained its peak intensity with winds of 65 mph (100 km/h) and a barometric pressure of 994 hPa (29.35 inHg) about 1,035 mi (1,665 km) to the northwest of the Cape Verde Islands. The storm would maintain this intensity for 24 hours as it began tracking towards the southwest in response to a mid-level trough located east of the storm. Tropical Storm Zeta continued to defy forecasts of weakening.

The effects of wind shear finally took their toll late on January 4, and Zeta's convection began to die down. This led to Tropical Storm Zeta weakening to a minimal tropical storm the following day. The NHC continued to overestimate how quickly Zeta would dissipate and early on January 5 they operationally downgraded Zeta to a depression, which was later confirmed to have been an error and the storm was "regretfully" upgraded back to tropical storm status the next advisory. Zeta continued to move west-northwestward, barely holding on to tropical storm status with Forecaster Richard Pasch noting "Although it seems as if Zeta will never die...the forecast insists on it doing so." However, the storm began to become disorganized again, and Zeta weakened into a tropical depression the following day on January 6 and degenerated into a remnant low later that day. With this transition, the very active 2005 hurricane season belatedly came to a close. The remnant low retained its identity for another day, before dissipating southeast of Bermuda during January 7.

NHC forecaster James Franklin noted that the atmosphere "seem[ed] to want to develop tropical storms ad nauseam". Due to the fact that Zeta, along with previous storms Epsilon and Vince, defied forecasts of weakening, the NHC remarked that they needed a better understanding of storms in the subtropics.

== Impact ==
Several of the crews that were taking part in the 2005 Atlantic Rowing Race were affected with heavy seas and strong adverse winds from Tropical Storm Zeta. Several teams encountered winds up to 50 mph (85 km/h) and large swells up to 12 ft (3.7 m). Although battered by torrential rain and high winds, the direction of the winds assisted some of the ships in the race by speeding them closer to Antigua.

One Welsh vessel was blown 25 mi (40 km) off-course, ending with an encounter with a 12 ft (3.7 m) shark that battered their boat. The ship Liberty Star made several reports of strong winds from Tropical Storm Zeta, including one of 40 mph (65 km/h) winds early on December 31, when the ship was about 45 miles (75 km) north of the storm. There were minor freight transport disruptions because several ships encountered strong winds and rough seas.

== Records and distinctions ==
- First time that the sixth letter of the Greek alphabet was used as the name of an Atlantic tropical storm; this did not happen again until Hurricane Zeta in 2020.
- Second latest-forming tropical cyclone ever recorded in an Atlantic hurricane season; only Hurricane Alice, which became a tropical storm around 12:00 UTC on December 30, 1954, formed later (by about six hours).
- One of only two Atlantic tropical cyclones, along with Hurricane Alice, known to have existed in two calendar years.
- Extended the record number of storms to form in the 2005 season to 28; this mark did not surpass until the 2020 season.

== See also ==
- List of off-season Atlantic hurricanes
- Timeline of the 2005 Atlantic hurricane season
