= James Franklin =

James Franklin may refer to:

- James Franklin (printer) (1697–1735), elder brother of Benjamin Franklin
- James Franklin (naturalist) (1783–1834), British naturalist
- Jim Franklin (artist) (born 1943), American poster artist
- Jimmy Franklin (1948–2005), American aerobatic pilot
- James Franklin (philosopher) (born 1953), Australian historian of ideas and philosopher
- James Franklin (American football coach) (born 1972), American college football coach
- James Franklin (quarterback) (born 1991), American football quarterback
- James Franklin (cricketer) (born 1980), New Zealand cricketer
- James Franklin (meteorologist), American meteorologist
- James M. Franklin (born 1942), Canadian geologist
- Jim Franklin (director), British television director
- James Franklin (politician), member of the Western Australian Legislative Council
- James Franklin Beatty Belford, Canadian politician
