= 2005 Woodvale Atlantic Rowing Race =

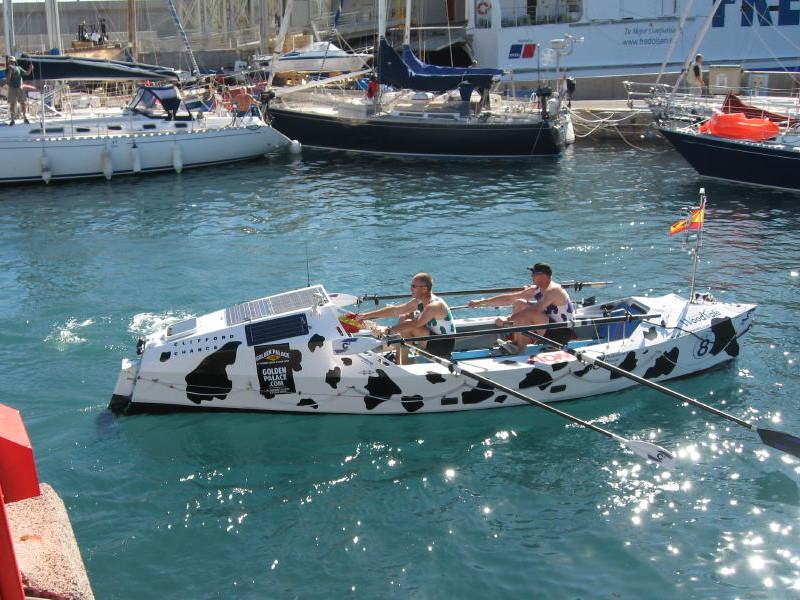
Doubles Winners C2 at Start of 2005 Race

- Winning Fours Team: Atlantic4 (GB), rowed by George Simpson, David Martin, Glynn Coupland & Neil Wightwick.
- Winning Doubles Team: C2 (GB), rowed by Clint Evans and Chris Andrews.

The 2005 race saw 20 doubles, 4 fours, and 2 solos depart La Gomera on 30 November 2005 to race to Antigua. The start was originally scheduled for 27 November but Tropical Storm Delta, and its accompanying bad weather, delayed the start. Unprecedented bad weather during the event led to 6 boats retiring from the race.

== Bad weather ==
The late-November start date was chosen as officially Atlantic hurricane seasons end on November 30; however, the 2005 Atlantic hurricane season was extremely active and lasted for an unusually long time, having tropical storms forming after the official end date.

A majority of the crews had completed between a quarter and a third of the race when there was a prolonged spell of unfavorable growing conditions. Rather than the typical trade winds, that would have been helping the fleet, there were strong westerly winds caused mainly by Hurricane Epsilon. These forced many of the crews to stop rowing completely and to deploy a sea anchor to prevent them from drifting backward.

In early January many of the fleets ended up passing through the southern edge of Tropical Storm Zeta, which raised high seas and created more adverse wind conditions. The bad weather all but prevented most crews from any attempt at a world record for the crossing.

== Results ==
=== Line Honours ===
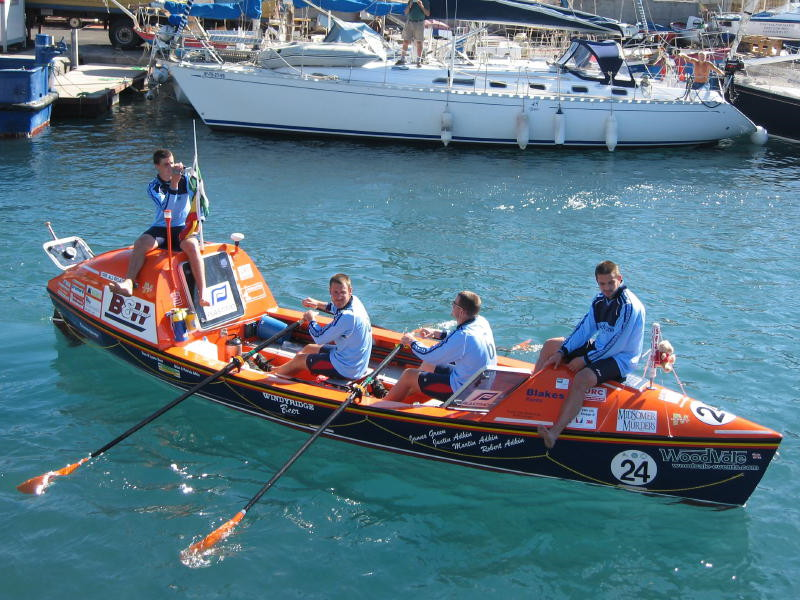
All Relative at Start of 2005 Race

First to finish was the boat "All Relative", crewed by Justin Adkin, Robert Adkin, Martin Adkin, and James Green from Beer, Devon. They had managed a fast start and were able to get clear of much of the bad weather that dogged other crews. Their lead had stretched to several hundred nautical miles before the other crews were able to start moving again. "All Relative" crossed the finish line in Antigua at 15:37:47 UTC on 8 January 2006; a crossing time of 39 days, 3 hours, 35 minutes, and 47 seconds which broke the race record by just over 22 hours but fell 3 days outside the World Record. The crew also included the youngest ever person to complete the row across the Atlantic, 19 when the race began, and 20 on 7 January 2006.

Second to finish was the four-man boat "Atlantic-4", crewed by David Martin, Neil Wightwick, Glynn Coupland, and George Simpson, who crossed the finish line at 02:26 UTC on 19 January 2006, a crossing time of 49 days, 14 hours, 21 minutes.

The third boat to finish was "Spirit of EDF Energy", crewed by double Olympic champion oarsman James Cracknell OBE and Ben Fogle, a UK TV presenter. They crossed the finish at 07:13 UTC on 19 January 2006, a crossing time of 49 days, 19 hours, and 8 minutes. They were eventually placed second in the doubles division due to a time penalty, issued for using their emergency water ration. A BBC television program on their experience, Through Hell and High Water, was aired in February 2006.

The fourth boat to finish, and winner of the Doubles division, was "C2", crewed by Britons Chris Andrews and Clint Evans, who crossed the line at 14:15 UTC on 20 January 2006, a crossing time of 51 days, 2 hours, 10 minutes.

In fifth place overall, and third, in the doubles division, was the crew "Boat de Vie". They were the first non-United Kingdom residents to finish the race, both crew members being residents of France. Both rowers were also leg-amputees and competed on equal terms with everyone else. They crossed the finish line at 15:36 UTC on 23 January 2006, a time of 54 days, 3 hours, 31 minutes.

In sixth place overall, and fourth in the doubles division, was the crew of "Atlantic Prince". They finished at 00:21 UTC on 28 January 2006, a time of 58 days, 12 hours, and 16 minutes. Their boat had the distinction that this was its fourth successful Atlantic crossing. The two crew were also former captains of First and Third Trinity Boat Club who had broken the world record for a "two-man 1,000,000-metres on a rowing machine" by about 4.5 hours only a couple of weeks before the race.

In seventh place overall, and fifth in the doubles division, was the crew "Team Scandines" crewed by Søren Sprogøe and Christian Petersen. They were the second crew of non-UK residents to finish, both crew members being from Denmark. They crossed the finish line at 21:11 UTC on 28 January 2006 – a time of 59 days, 19 hours, and 6 minutes.

In eighth place overall, and sixth in the doubles division, was "Row4Cancer" crewed by Liz O'Keeffe and Richard Mayon-White. They were the first mixed crew to finish and Liz was the first woman to reach Antigua, over a week ahead of the next woman. They crossed the finish line at 07:01 UTC on 30 January 2006 – a time of 60 days, 18 hours, 56 minutes. They had also suffered four complete capsize during the race and lost much of their kit.

Mission Atlantic, crewed by four women from Guernsey ( Kathy Tracey, Sarah Day, Paula Evemy, and Lois Rawlins-Deguelin) finished the race in 67 days, 7 hours, and 20 minutes and they became the first Women's Fours ever to cross an ocean – any ocean – and therefore held the world record for the fastest Ladies Fours across the Atlantic. They also were the only fours boat to complete the race without using any of their emergency water ballast.

The first solo to cross the finish line was Chris Martin in the boat "Pacific Pete". He crossed the finish at 03:24 UTC on 7 February 2006 – a crossing time of 68 days, 15 hours, 19 minutes. Martin had rowed for Great Britain in six consecutive World Championships – at junior, under 23, and senior levels.

=== Adjusted Final Positions ===
The final positions were adjusted from the Line Honours due to the ballast rule, which penalizes the use of emergency drinking water as it makes the boat lighter and therefore faster. Due to the bad weather, four boats were forced to use this supply. The positions were not adjusted until the last boat had finished, leading to accusations of favoritism for the celebrities and some confusion as to who had "won"; as the penalties were applied per finishing order across all classes.

- Overall Race Winners:
  - C2

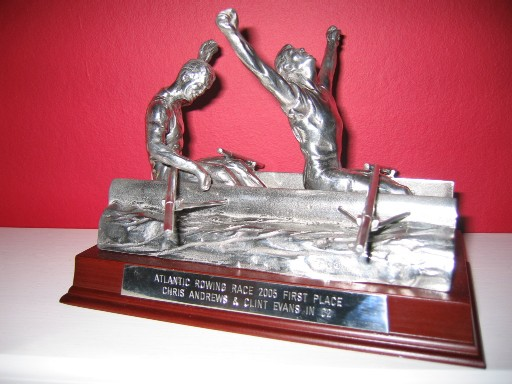
WINNER'S TROPHY FOR 2005-6 ATLANTIC ROWING RACE

- Solos:
  - Both disqualified (Roz Savage for missing the finish buoy, Chris Martin for being assisted)
- Doubles:
  - 1st C2
  - 2nd Spirit of EDF Energy (penalized 1 place for using 60L of water)
  - 3rd Bout de Vie
- Fours:
  - 1st Atlantic4(Penalised 1 place for using 60L of water)
  - 2nd All Relative (Penalised 2 places for using 120L of water)
  - 3rd Mission Atlantic (Women)
  - 4th Cowgirls (Women)

=== Retiring crews ===
Six crews retired from the race:

- Digicel Atlantic Challenge (Double) – retired 8 January 2006 due to capsizing and the subsequent unrepairable damage.
- American Fire (Double) – retired on 15 January 2006 due to a capsize.
- Sun Latte (Double) – retired 15 January 2006 due to unrepairable damage due to a capsize.
- Move ahead (Double) – retired 19 January 2006 due to a capsize.
- Spirit of Cornwall (Double) – retired 23 January 2006, due to a capsize with less than 200 miles (320 km) left in the race. They were in 6th position overall when they retired.
- Serenity Now (Double) – retired 24 January 2006 due to a capsize.
