= Timeline of the 2005 Atlantic hurricane season =

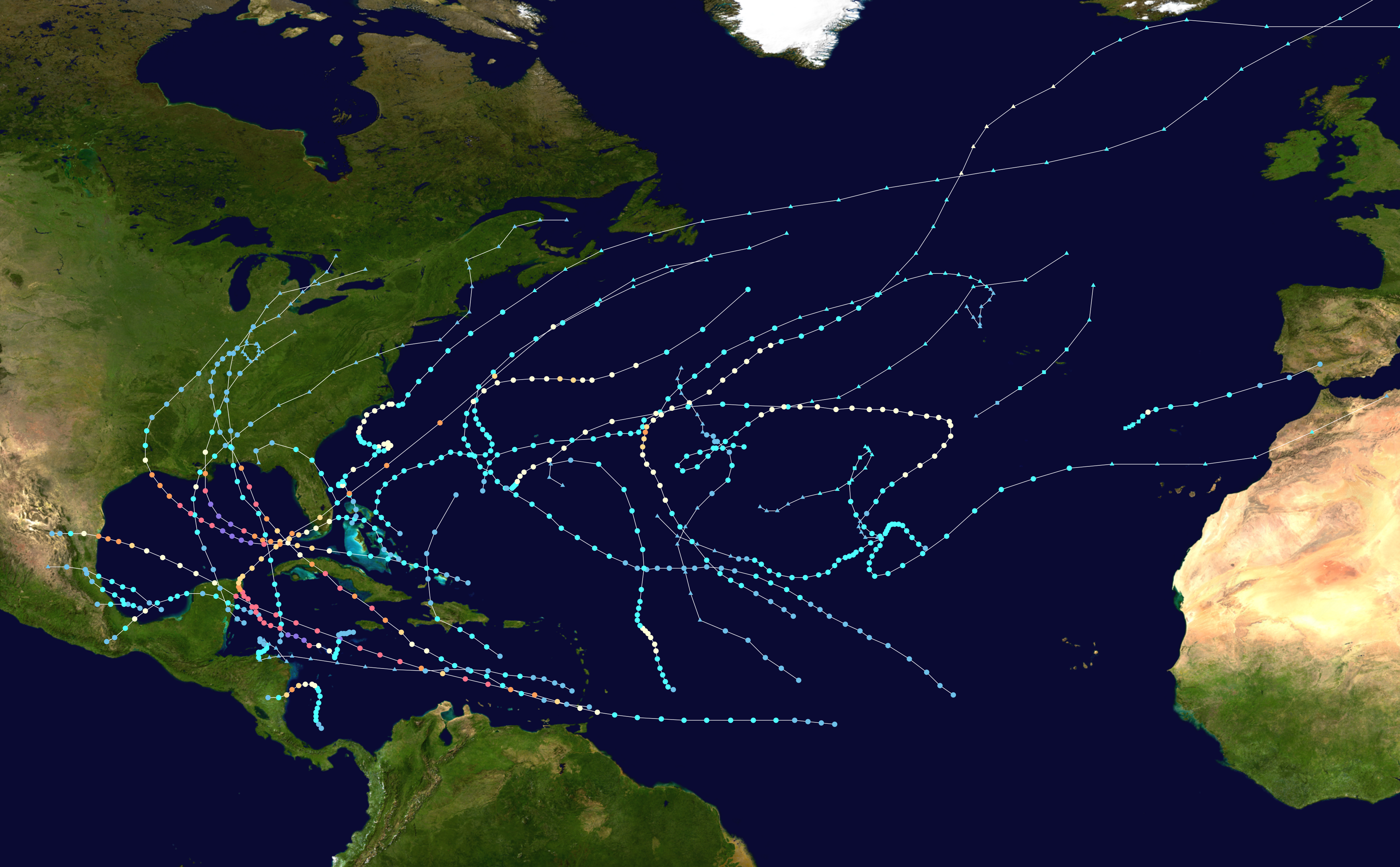
- Season summary map

Season boundaries
- First system formed: June 8, 2005
- Last system dissipated: January 6, 2006

Strongest system
- Name: Wilma
- Maximum winds: 185 mph (295 km/h) (1-minute sustained)
- Lowest pressure: 882 mbar (hPa; 26.05 inHg)

Longest lasting system
- Name: Irene
- Duration: 14 days
Storm articles
- Tropical Storm Arlene (2005)
- Tropical Storm Bret (2005)
- Hurricane Cindy (2005)
- Hurricane Dennis
- Hurricane Emily (2005)
- Tropical Storm Gert (2005)
- Hurricane Irene (2005)
- Tropical Storm Jose (2005)
- Hurricane Katrina
- Hurricane Nate (2005)
- Hurricane Ophelia (2005)
- Hurricane Rita
- Hurricane Stan
- Tropical Storm Tammy (2005)
- Hurricane Vince
- Hurricane Wilma
- Tropical Storm Alpha (2005)
- Hurricane Beta
- Tropical Storm Gamma (2005)
- Tropical Storm Delta (2005)
- Hurricane Epsilon (2005)
- Tropical Storm Zeta (2005)

The 2005 Atlantic hurricane season was an event in the annual tropical cyclone season in the north Atlantic Ocean. It was the second most active Atlantic hurricane season in recorded history, and the most extreme (i.e. produced the highest accumulated cyclone energy (ACE)) in the satellite era. Officially, the season began on June 1, 2005 and ended on November 30, 2005. These dates, adopted by convention, historically delimit the period in each year when most tropical systems form. The season's first storm, Tropical Storm Arlene, developed on June 8. The final storm, Tropical Storm Zeta, formed in late December and persisted until January 6, 2006. Zeta is only the second December Atlantic storm in recorded history to survive into January, joining Hurricane Alice in 1955.

The season's impact was widespread and catastrophic. Its storms touched virtually every part of the Atlantic basin. Altogether, there were 28 named tropical storms during the season, exhausting the annual pre-designated list and resulting in the usage of six Greek letter names. A record 15 tropical storms attained hurricane strength, of which a record seven intensified into major hurricanes. (Note: A tropical storm becomes a hurricane when its maximum sustained winds reach 74 miles per hour (119 km/h); hurricanes reaching Category 3, with wind speeds of 111 miles per hour (179 km/h)) or higher on the 5-level Saffir–Simpson wind speed scale, are considered major hurricanes.) Six hurricanes made landfall or near-landfall on the U.S. during the season: Cindy, Dennis, Katrina, Ophelia, Rita and Wilma.

This timeline documents tropical cyclone formations, strengthening, weakening, landfalls, extratropical transitions, and dissipations during the season. It includes information that was not released throughout the season, meaning that data from post-storm reviews by the National Hurricane Center, such as a storm that was not initially warned upon, has been included.

The time stamp for each event is first stated using Coordinated Universal Time (UTC), the 24-hour clock where 00:00 = midnight UTC. The NHC uses both UTC and the time zone where the center of the tropical cyclone is currently located. The time zones utilized (east to west) prior to 2020 were: Atlantic, Eastern, and Central. In this timeline, the respective area time is included in parentheses. Additionally, figures for maximum sustained winds and position estimates are rounded to the nearest 5 units (miles, or kilometers), following National Hurricane Center practice. Direct wind observations are rounded to the nearest whole number. Atmospheric pressures are listed to the nearest millibar and nearest hundredth of an inch of mercury.

== Timeline ==
=== June ===
==== June 1 ====
- The 2005 Atlantic hurricane season officially begins.

==== June 8 ====
- 18:00 UTC (2:00 p.m. EDT) – Tropical Depression One forms just north of the northeastern coast of Honduras.

==== June 9 ====
- 06:00 UTC (2:00 a.m. EDT) – Tropical Depression One strengthens into Tropical Storm Arlene about 170 miles (270 km) west-southwest of Grand Cayman Island.

==== June 10 ====
- 08:00 UTC (4:00 a.m. EDT) – Tropical Storm Arlene makes landfall near Cabo Corrientes, Cuba with sustained winds of 50 mph (80 km/h) (Note: The figures for maximum sustained winds and position estimates are rounded to the nearest 5 units (knots, miles, or kilometers), following the convention used in the National Hurricane Center's operational products for each storm. All other units are rounded to the nearest digit.) winds.

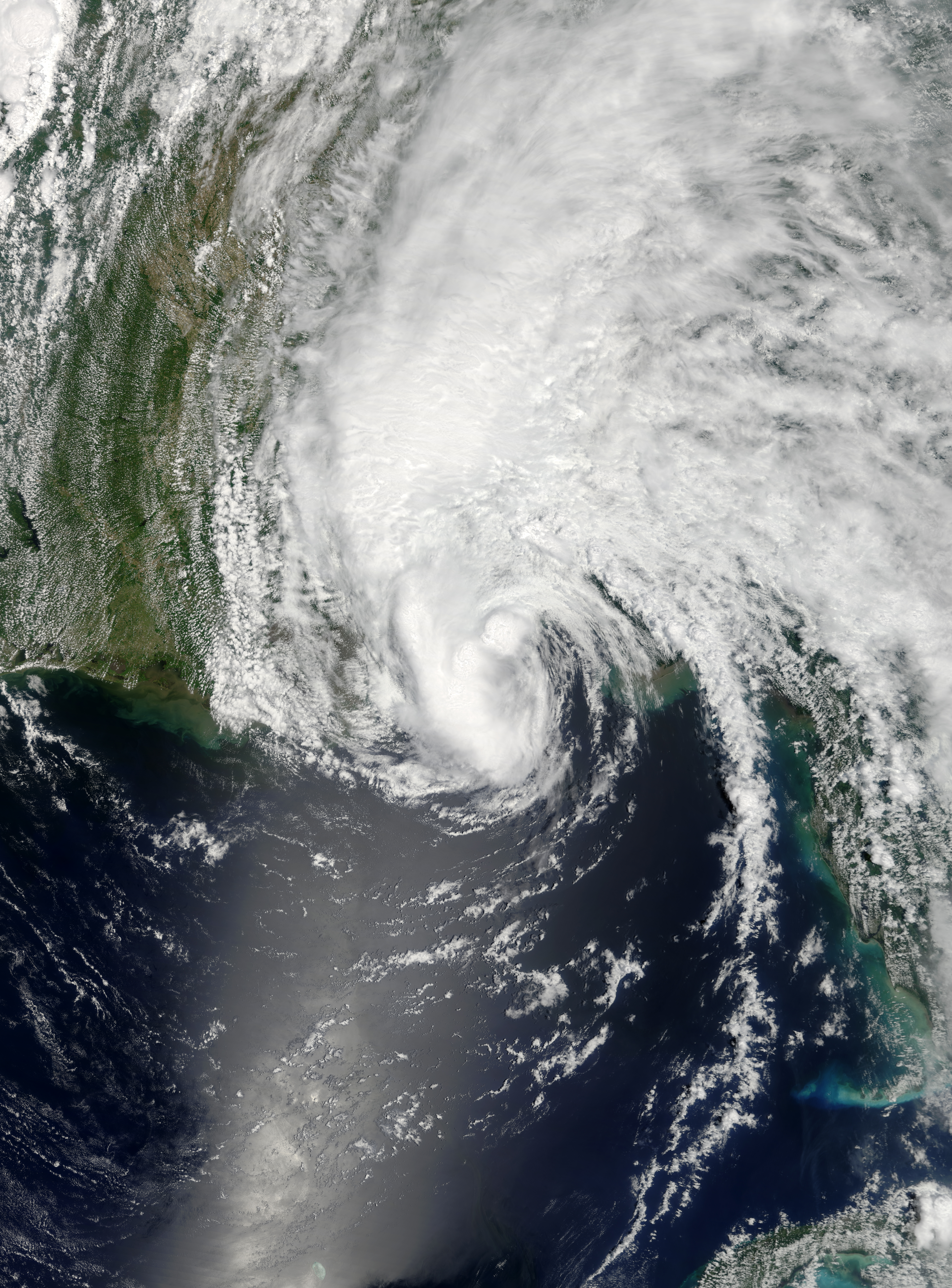
Tropical Storm Arlene making landfall near Pensacola, Florida on June 11

==== June 11 ====
- 01:00 UTC (8:00 p.m. CDT, June 10) – Tropical Storm Arlene reaches its peak intensity over the northeastern Gulf of Mexico with sustained winds of 70 mph (110 km/h) and a minimum pressure of 989 mbar (29.21 inHg).
- 19:00 UTC (2:00 p.m. CDT) – Tropical Storm Arlene makes landfall west of Pensacola, Florida with 60 mph (97 km/h) winds.

==== June 12 ====
- 00:00 UTC (7:00 p.m. CDT, June 11) – Tropical Storm Arlene weakens into a tropical depression inland near Barlow Bend, Alabama.

==== June 13 ====
- 18:00 UTC (2:00 p.m. EDT) – Tropical Depression Arlene becomes extratropical just northeast of Flint, Michigan and is later absorbed by a front.

==== June 28 ====
- 18:00 UTC (1:00 p.m. CDT) – Tropical Depression Two forms about 63 mi (101 km) northeast of Veracruz, Veracruz.

==== June 29 ====
- 00:00 UTC (7:00 p.m. CDT, June 28) – Tropical Depression Two strengthens into Tropical Storm Bret about 55 mi (89 km) north-northeast of Veracruz.
- 12:00 UTC (7:00 a.m. CDT) – Tropical Storm Bret makes landfall near Tuxpan, Veracruz with 40 mph (64 km/h) winds.
- 18:00 UTC (1:00 p.m. CDT) – Tropical Storm Bret weakens into a tropical depression southwest of Tampico, Tamaulipas.

==== June 30 ====
- 03:00 UTC (10:00 p.m. CDT, June 29) – Tropical Depression Bret dissipates inland about 40 mi (64 km) west of Tampico.

=== July ===
==== July 3 ====
- 18:00 UTC (1:00 p.m. CDT) – Tropical Depression Three forms about 80 mi (130 km) east of Chetumal, Quintana Roo.

==== July 4 ====
- 03:30 UTC (10:30 p.m. CDT, July 3) – Tropical Depression Three makes landfall about 22 mi (35 km) north-northeast of Majahual, Quintana Roo with sustained winds of 35 mph (56 km/h).
- 18:00 UTC (2:00 p.m. EDT) – Tropical Depression Four forms over the southern Windward Islands.
- 21:00 UTC (5:00 p.m. EDT) – Tropical Depression Four makes landfall on Grenada with sustained winds of 30 mph (48 km/h).

==== July 5 ====
- 06:00 UTC (1:00 a.m. CDT) – Tropical Depression Three strengthens into Tropical Storm Cindy over the central Gulf of Mexico.
- 12:00 UTC (8:00 a.m. EDT) – Tropical Depression Four strengthens into Tropical Storm Dennis southeast of San Juan, Puerto Rico.

==== July 6 ====
- 00:00 UTC (7:00 p.m. CDT, July 5) – Tropical Storm Cindy strengthens into a hurricane about 46 mi (74 km) south-southwest of Grand Isle, Louisiana.
- 03:00 UTC (10:00 p.m. CDT, July 5) – Hurricane Cindy makes landfall just southwest of Grand Isle with winds of 75 mph (121 km/h).
- 06:00 UTC (1:00 a.m. CDT) – Hurricane Cindy weakens into a tropical storm south-southeast of New Orleans, Louisiana along the Gulf coast.
- 09:00 UTC (5:00 a.m. CDT) – Tropical Storm Cindy makes landfall just southeast of Ansley, Mississippi with winds of 50 mph (80 km/h).
- 15:00 UTC (10:00 a.m. CDT) – Tropical Storm Cindy weakens to a tropical depression inland about 50 mi (80 km) north-northwest of Mobile, Alabama.
- 22:00 UTC (6:00 p.m. EDT) – Tropical Storm Dennis strengthens into a hurricane about 315 mi (507 km) east-southeast of Kingston, Jamaica.

==== July 7 ====
- 12:00 UTC (8:00 a.m. EDT (1500 UTC) – Tropical Depression Cindy becomes extratropical over northern Georgia, and subsequently dissipates over the Gulf of St. Lawrence.
- 12:00 UTC (8:00 a.m. EDT) – Hurricane Dennis intensifies to Category 2 about 130 mi (210 km) east-southeast of Kingston.
- 18:00 UTC (2:00 p.m. EDT) – Hurricane Dennis intensifies to Category 3 about 65 mi (105 km) northeast of Kingston.

==== July 8 ====
- 00:00 UTC (8:00 p.m. EDT, July 7) – Hurricane Dennis intensifies to Category 4 about 50 mi (80 km) southeast of Cabo Cruz, Cuba.
- 02:45 UTC (10:45 p.m. EDT, July 7) – Hurricane Dennis makes landfall near Punta del Ingles (just east of Cabo Cruz) with 140 mph (230 km/h) winds.
- 03:00 UTC (11:00 p.m. EDT, July 7) – Hurricane Dennis weakens to Category 3 while passing over land.
- 12:00 UTC (8:00 a.m. EDT) – Hurricane Dennis re-intensifies to Category 4 over the Gulf of Guacanayabo and attains its maximum sustained wind speed of 150 mph (240 km/h).
- 18:45 UTC (2:45 p.m. EDT) – Hurricane Dennis makes landfall just west of Punta Mangles Altos (in southern Matanzas Province with winds of 140 mph (230 km/h).

==== July 9 ====
- 09:00 UTC (5:00 a.m. EDT) – Hurricane Dennis emerges into the Straits of Florida just east of Havana at Category 1 strength.
- 11:00 UTC (7:00 a.m. EDT) – Hurricane Dennis re-intensifies to Category 2 about 95 mi (153 km) west-southwest of Key West, Florida.
- 23:00 UTC (7:00 p.m. EDT) – Hurricane Dennis re-intensifies to Category 3 about 285 mi (459 km) south of Panama City, Florida.

Hurricane Dennis approaching the Gulf Coast of the United States on July 10

==== July 10 ====
- 05:00 UTC (1:00 a.m. EDT) – Hurricane Dennis re-intensifies to Category 4 about 235 mi (378 km) south of Panama City.
- 12:00 UTC (7:00 a.m. CDT) – Hurricane Dennis attains a minimum pressure of 930 mbar (27.46 inHg) south-southeast of Pensacola, Florida.
- 19:00 UTC (2:00 p.m. CDT) – Hurricane Dennis weakens to Category 3 about 20 mi (32 km) east-southeast of Pensacola.
- 19:30 UTC (2:30 p.m. CDT) – Hurricane Dennis makes landfall on Santa Rosa Island, 10 mi (16 km) west of Navarre Beach, Florida with 120 mph (190 km/h) winds.

==== July 11 ====
- 00:00 UTC (8:00 p.m. AST, July 10) – Tropical Depression Five forms in the central Atlantic about 1,250 mi (2,010 km) east of the southern Windward Islands.
- 01:00 UTC (8:00 p.m. CDT, July 10) – Hurricane Dennis weakens into a tropical storm about 20 mi (32 km) northeast of Jackson, Alabama.
- 06:00 UTC (1:00 a.m. CDT) – Tropical Storm Dennis weakens into a tropical depression over central Alabama.

==== July 12 ====
- 00:00 UTC (8:00 p.m. AST, July 11) – Tropical Depression Five strengthens into Tropical Storm Emily about 920 mi (1,480 km) east of the southern Windward Islands.

==== July 13 ====
- 15:00 UTC (10:00 a.m. CDT) – Tropical Depression Dennis becomes a remnant low about 125 mi (201 km) west-northwest of Lexington, Kentucky, and is subsequently absorbed into a larger low over Ontario.

==== July 14 ====
- 00:00 UTC (8:00 p.m. AST, July 13) – Tropical Storm Emily attains hurricane strength about 85 mi (137 km) east-southeast of Grenada.
- 07:00 UTC (3:00 a.m. AST) – Hurricane Emily makes landfall on Grenada with 90 mph (140 km/h) winds.
- 12:00 UTC (8:00 a.m. AST) – Hurricane Emily intensifies to Category 2 strength about 85 mi (137 km) west-northwest of Grenada.
- 18:00 UTC (2:00 p.m. AST) – Hurricane Emily intensifies to Category 3 strength about 490 mi (790 km) southeast of Santo Domingo, Dominican Republic.

==== July 15 ====
- 06:00 UTC (2:00 a.m. AST) – Hurricane Emily intensifies to Category 4 strength about 350 mi (560 km) southeast of Santo Domingo.

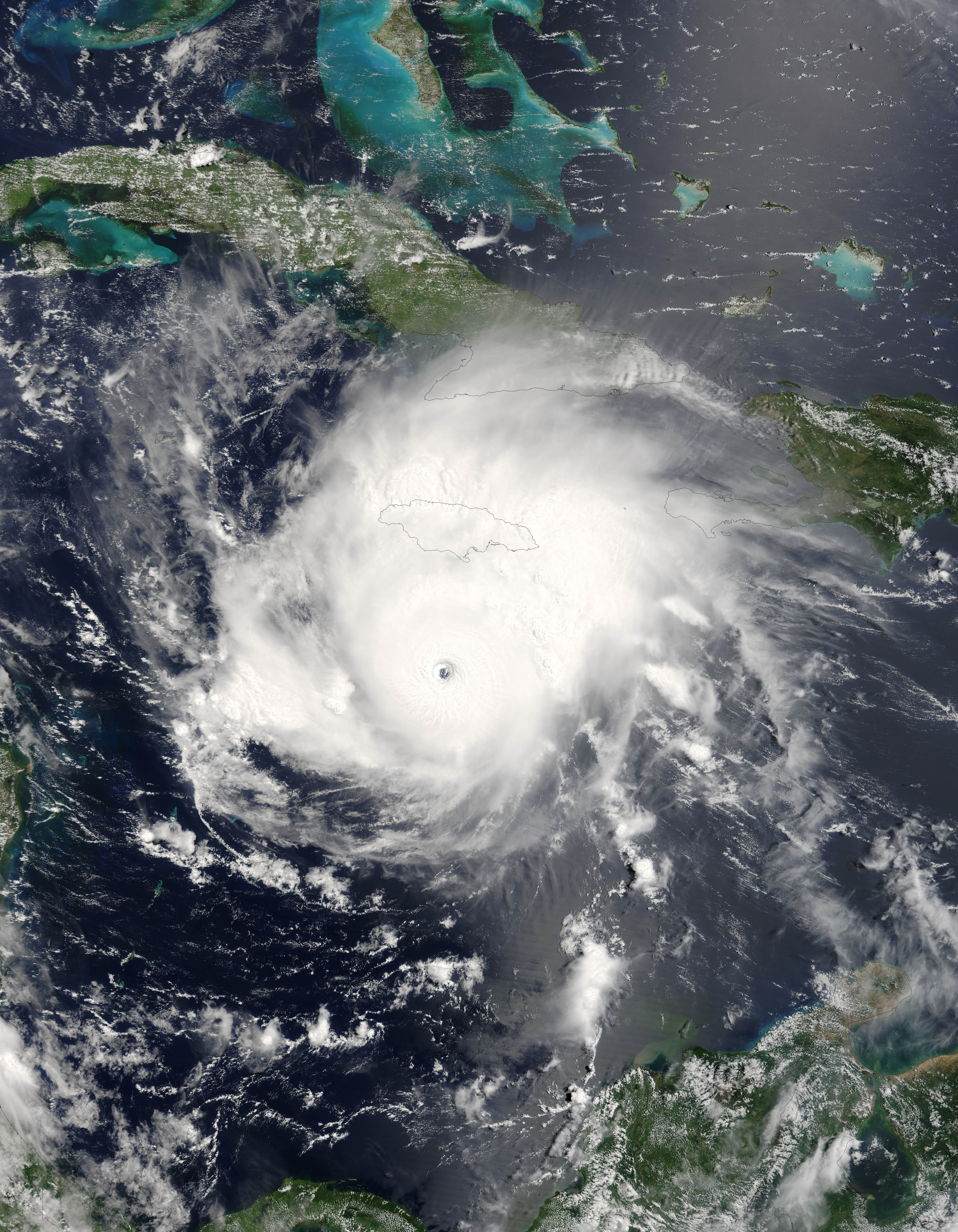
Hurricane Emily near peak intensity on July 16

==== July 17 ====
- 00:00 UTC (8:00 p.m. EDT, July 16) – Hurricane Emily intensifies to Category 5 strength about 120 mi (190 km) southwest of Jamaica, reaching its peak intensity with maximum sustained winds of 160 mph (260 km/h) and a minimum barometric pressure of 929 mbar (27.43 inHg).

==== July 18 ====
- 06:30 UTC (2:30 a.m. EDT) – Hurricane Emily makes landfall near Tulum, Quintana Roo with 130 mph (210 km/h) winds.
- 12:00 UTC (8:00 a.m. EDT) – Hurricane Emily weakens over the Yucatán Peninsula, emerging into the Gulf of Mexico near Mérida, Yucatán at Category 1 strength.

==== July 19 ====
- 18:00 UTC (1:00 p.m. CDT) – Hurricane Emily re-intensifies to Category 2 strength.

==== July 20 ====
- 00:00 UTC (7:00 p.m. CDT, July 19) – Hurricane Emily re-intensifies to Category 3 strength.
- 11:30 UTC (6:30 a.m. CDT) – Hurricane Emily makes landfall near San Fernando, Tamaulipas with 125 mph (201 km/h) winds.
- 21:00 UTC (4:00 p.m. CDT) – Hurricane Emily weakens to a tropical storm about 80 mi (130 km) southeast of Monterrey, Nuevo León.

==== July 21 ====
- 09:00 UTC (4:00 a.m. CDT) – Tropical Storm Emily weakens to a tropical depression about 80 mi (130 km) southwest of Monterrey.
- 18:00 UTC (12:00 p.m. CDT) – Tropical Depression Emily dissipates over the Sierra Madre Oriental.
- 18:00 UTC (1:00 p.m. EDT) – Tropical Depression Six forms about 69 mi (111 km) east of Eleuthera Island, Bahamas.

==== July 22 ====
- 00:00 UTC (8:00 p.m. EDT, July 21) – Tropical Depression Six strengthens into Tropical Storm Franklin about 81 mi (130 km) east-southeast of Great Abaco Island, Bahamas.

==== July 23 ====
- 18:00 UTC (3:00 p.m. CDT) – Tropical Depression Seven forms in the Bay of Campeche, about 293 mi (472 km) east-southeast of Tuxpan, Veracruz.
- 21:00 UTC (5:00 p.m. EDT) – Tropical Storm Franklin attains its maximum sustained wind speed of 70 mph (110 km/h) while centered about 316 mi (509 km) east of Cape Canaveral, Florida.

==== July 24 ====
- 06:00 UTC (1:00 a.m. CDT) – Tropical Depression Seven becomes Tropical Storm Gert about 195 mi (314 km) east-southeast of Tuxpan.

==== July 25 ====
- 00:00 UTC (7:00 p.m. CDT, July 24) – Tropical Storm Gert reaches its maximum intensity, with sustained winds of 45 mph (72 km/h) and a minimum pressure of 1,005 mbar (29.68 inHg), at landfall, just north of Cabo Rojo, Tamaulipas.
- 09:00 UTC (4:00 a.m. CDT) – Tropical Storm Gert weakens to a tropical depression about 80 mi (130 km) west of Tampico, Tamaulipas.
- 18:00 UTC (1:00 p.m. CDT) – Tropical Depression Gert becomes a remnant low and dissipates over the mountains of central Mexico.

==== July 28 ====
- 00:00 UTC (8:00 p.m. AST) – Tropical Storm Franklin attains a minimum pressure of 997 mbar (29.44 inHg) west-northwest of Bermuda.

==== July 29 ====
- 21:00 UTC (5:00 p.m. AST) – Tropical Storm Franklin becomes extratropical about 265 mi (426 km) east-southeast of Halifax, Nova Scotia, and is later absorbed by a larger extratropical system over the far northern Atlantic.

=== August ===
==== August 2 ====
- 18:00 UTC (2:00 p.m. AST) – Tropical Depression Eight forms about 370 mi (600 km) southwest of Bermuda.

==== August 3 ====
- 06:00 UTC (2:00 a.m. AST) – Tropical Depression Eight strengthens into Tropical Storm Harvey about 290 mi (470 km) southwest of Bermuda

==== August 4 ====
- 18:00 UTC (2:00 p.m. AST) – Tropical Depression Nine forms about 690 mi (1,110 km) west of the Cape Verde Islands.

==== August 7 ====
- 15:00 UTC (11:00 a.m. AST) – Tropical Depression Nine strengthens into Tropical Storm Irene about 1,240 mi (2,000 km) east of the northern Leeward Islands.

==== August 8 ====
- 12:00 UTC (8:00 a.m. AST) – Tropical Storm Irene weakens into a tropical depression.

==== August 10 ====
- 00:00 UTC (8:00 p.m. AST, August 9) – Tropical Storm Harvey becomes extratropical in northern Atlantic about 560 mi (900 km) southeast of Newfoundland, and subsequently dissipates.

==== August 11 ====
- 00:00 UTC (8:00 p.m. AST, August 10) – Tropical Depression Irene re-intensifies to tropical storm strength about 350 mi (560 km) northeast of the Leeward Islands.

==== August 13 ====
- 12:00 UTC (8:00 a.m. AST) – Tropical Depression Ten forms about 1,064 mi (1,712 km) east of Barbados.

==== August 14 ====
- 15:00 UTC (11:00 a.m. AST) – Tropical Depression Ten degenerates into a remnant low and subsequently dissipates.

==== August 15 ====
- 00:00 UTC (8:00 p.m. AST, August 14) – Tropical Storm Irene intensifies to hurricane strength roughly midway between Bermuda and the Outer Banks of North Carolina.

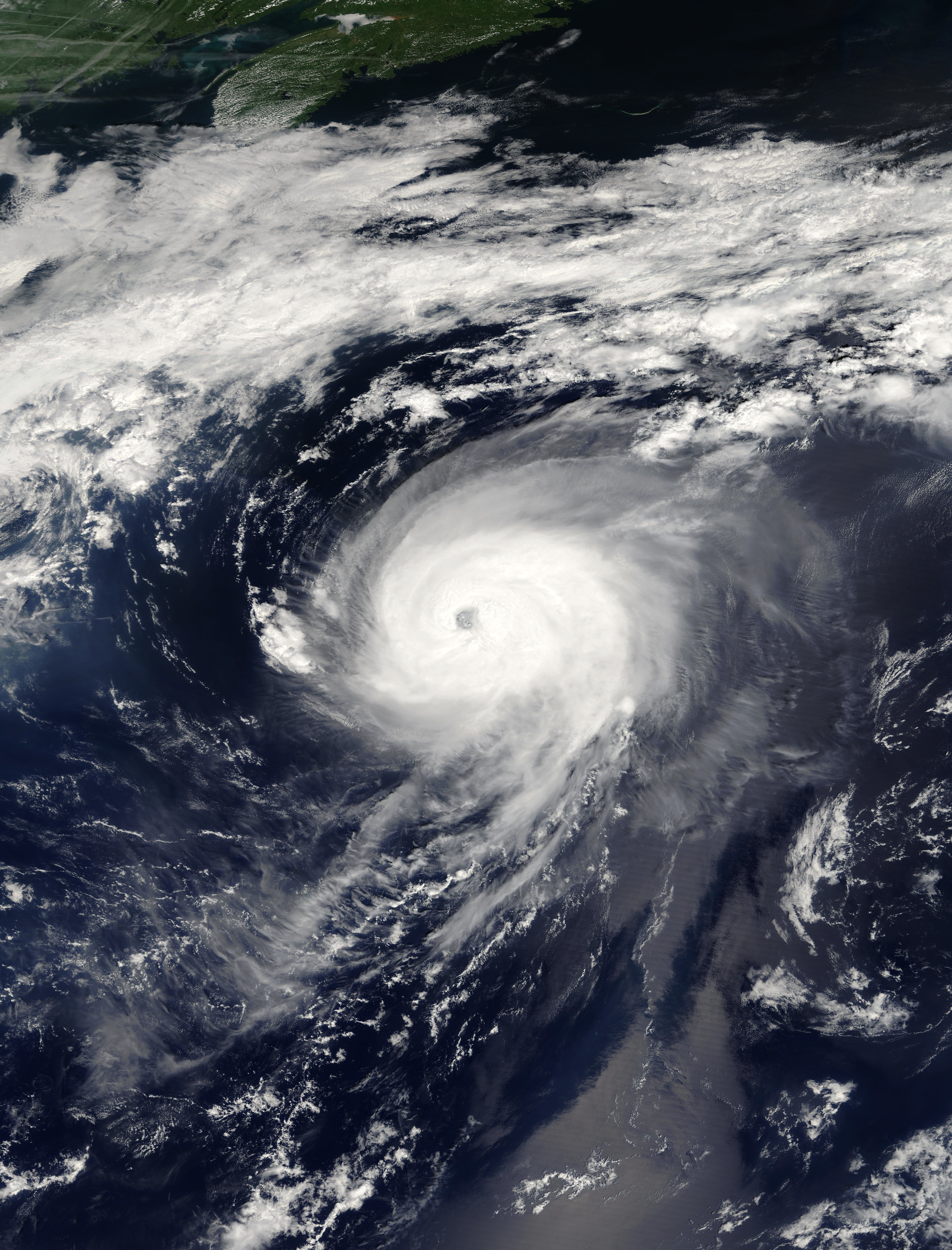
Hurricane Irene at peak intensity on August 16

==== August 16 ====
- 12:00 UTC (8:00 a.m. AST) – Hurricane Irene reaches Category 2 intensity.
- 18:00 UTC (2:00 p.m. AST) – Hurricane Irene reaches its peak intensity with sustained winds of 100 mph (160 km/h) and minimum pressure of 970 mbar (28.64 inHg) about 350 mi (560 km) northeast of Bermuda.

==== August 18 ====
- 00:00 UTC (8:00 AST, August 17) – Hurricane Irene weakens to a tropical storm about 520 mi (840 km) south of Cape Race, Newfoundland.
- 18:00 UTC (2:00 p.m. AST) – Tropical Storm Irene is absorbed by a larger extratropical system 290 mi (470 km) east-southeast of Cape Race.

==== August 22 ====
- 12:00 UTC (8:00 a.m. EDT) – Tropical Depression Eleven forms about 109 mi (175 km) east of Veracruz, Veracruz.
- 18:00 UTC (2:00 p.m. EDT) – Tropical Depression Eleven strengthens into Tropical Storm Jose about 81 mi (130 km) east-northeast of Veracruz.

==== August 23 ====
- 03:30 UTC (10:30 p.m. CDT, August 22) – Tropical Storm Jose makes landfall about 35 mi (56 km) north of Veracruz with 60 mph (97 km/h) winds.
- 12:00 UTC (7:00 a.m. CDT) – Tropical Storm Jose weakens to a tropical depression about 85 mi (137 km) south-southeast of Tuxpan, Veracruz and soon dissipates over the mountains of eastern Mexico.
- 18:00 UTC (2:00 p.m. EDT) – Tropical Depression Twelve forms near Long Island, Bahamas.

==== August 24 ====
- 12:00 UTC (8:00 a.m. EDT) – Tropical Depression Twelve strengthens into Tropical Storm Katrina about 75 mi (121 km) east-southeast of Nassau, Bahamas.

==== August 25 ====
- 21:00 UTC (5:00 p.m. EDT) – Tropical Storm Katrina intensifies to hurricane strength about 15 mi (24 km) east-northeast of Fort Lauderdale, Florida.
- 22:30 UTC (6:30 p.m. EDT) – Hurricane Katrina makes its first landfall between Hallandale Beach and North Miami Beach, Florida, United States with 80 mph (129 km/h) winds.

==== August 26 ====
- 05:00 UTC (1:00 a.m. EDT) – Hurricane Katrina weakens over Monroe County, Florida and emerges into the gulf of Mexico as a tropical storm just north of Cape Sable.
- 06:00 UTC (2:00 a.m. EDT) – Tropical Storm Katrina re-intensifies to hurricane strength.
- 18:00 UTC (2:00 p.m. EDT) – Hurricane Katrina reaches Category 2 intensity.

==== August 27 ====
- 12:00 UTC (8:00 a.m. EDT) – Hurricane Katrina reaches Category 3 intensity; radar and reconnaissance aircraft locate its eye about 430 mi (690 km) southeast of the mouth of the Mississippi River.

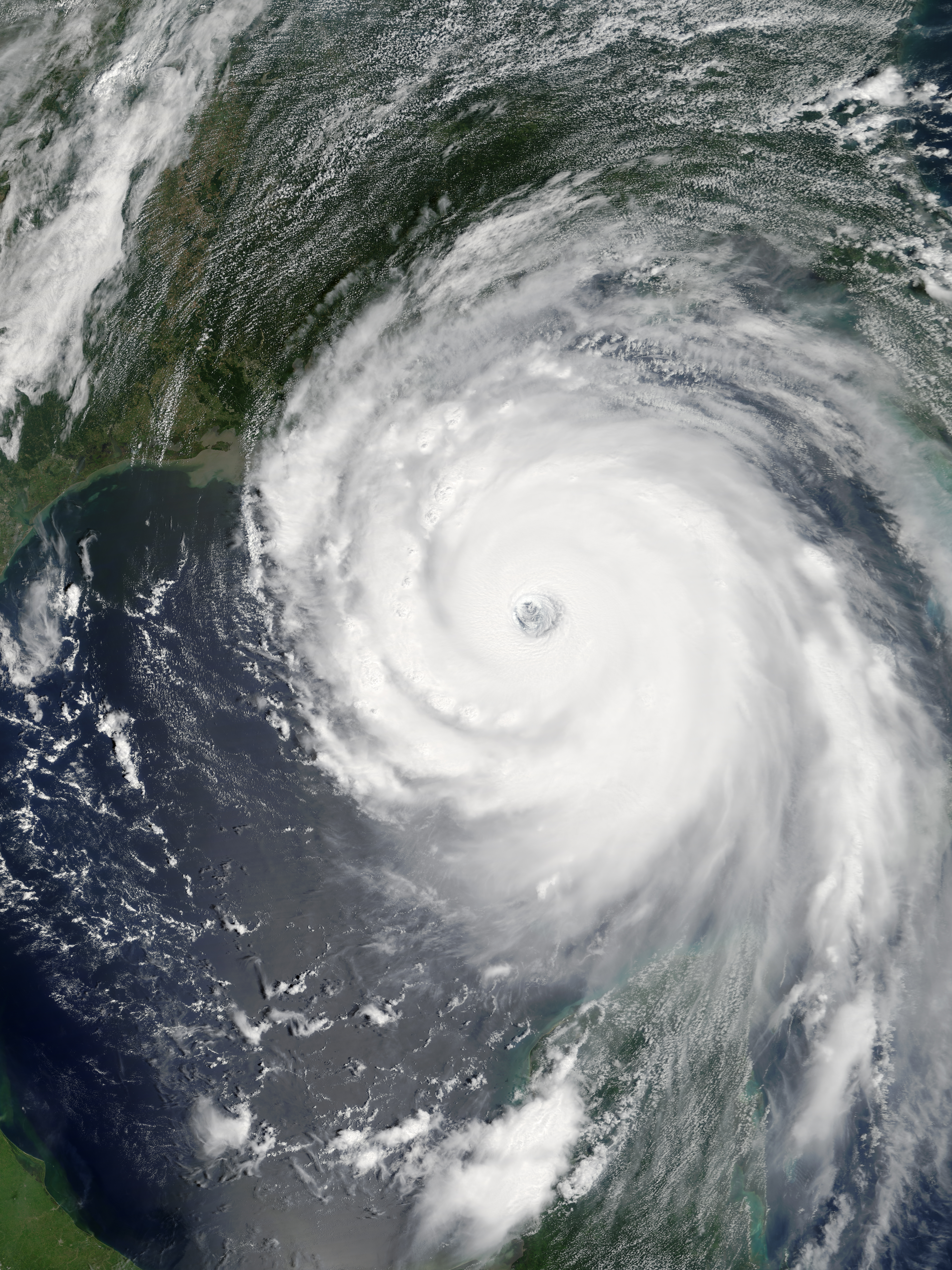
Hurricane Katrina in the Gulf of Mexico near its peak Category 5 intensity

==== August 28 ====
- 06:00 UTC (1:00 a.m. CDT) – Hurricane Katrina reaches Category 4 intensity.
- 12:00 UTC (7:00 a.m. CDT) – Hurricane Katrina reaches Category 5 intensity.
- 12:00 UTC (8:00 a.m. AST) – Tropical Depression Thirteen forms about 960 mi (1,540 km) east of the Lesser Antilles.
- 18:00 UTC (1:00 p.m. CDT) – Hurricane Katrina reaches its peak intensity about 170 n mi southeast of the mouth of the Mississippi River with maximum sustained winds of 170 mph (270 km/h) and a minimum barometric pressure of 902 mbar (26.64 inHg).

==== August 29 ====
- 11:00 UTC (6:00 a.m. CDT) – Hurricane Katrina makes landfall near Buras, Louisiana with upper-Category 3 sustained winds of 130 mph (210 km/h).
- 15:00 UTC (10:00 a.m. CDT) – Hurricane Katrina makes its final landfall near the mouth of the Pearl River, just south of Pearlington, Mississippi, with sustained winds of 120 mph (190 km/h) winds after crossing Breton Sound.
- 15:00 UTC (11:00 a.m. AST) – Tropical Depression Thirteen degenerates into a broad area of low pressure about 745 mi (1,199 km) east-northeast of the Lesser Antilles.

==== August 30 ====
- 00:00 UTC (7:00 p.m. CDT, August 29) – Hurricane Katrina weakens into a tropical storm just northwest of Meridian, Mississippi.
- 12:00 UTC (7:00 a.m. CDT) – Tropical Storm Katrina weakens into a tropical depression over Middle Tennessee.

==== August 31 ====
- 00:00 UTC (8:00 p.m. EDT, August 30) – Tropical Depression Katrina transitions into an extratropical low pressure system over the Ohio Valley and is later absorbed within a frontal zone over the eastern Great Lakes.
- 06:00 UTC (2:00 a.m. AST) – Tropical Depression Thirteen regenerates 890 mi (1,430 km) east-southeast of Bermuda.
- 12:00 UTC (8:00 a.m. AST) – Tropical Depression Thirteen strengthens into Tropical Storm Lee in the central Atlantic between Bermuda and the Azores.

=== September ===
==== September 1 ====
- 00:00 UTC (8:00 p.m. AST, August 31) – Tropical Storm Lee weakens to a tropical depression.
- 12:00 UTC (8:00 a.m. AST) – Tropical Depression Fourteen forms 1,050 mi (1,690 km) east of the northern Leeward Islands.

==== September 2 ====
- 06:00 UTC (2:00 a.m. AST) – Tropical Depression Lee degenerates into a remnant low over the central Atlantic.
- 12:00 UTC (8:00 a.m. AST) – Tropical Depression Fourteen strengthens into Tropical Storm Maria.

==== September 4 ====
- 09:00 UTC (5:00 a.m. AST) – Tropical Storm Maria intensifies into a hurricane about 465 mi (748 km) east of Bermuda.

==== September 5 ====
- 12:00 UTC (8:00 a.m. AST) – Hurricane Maria reaches Category 2 intensity.
- 18:00 UTC (2:00 p.m. AST) – Tropical Depression Fifteen forms 350 mi (560 km) south-southwest of Bermuda.

==== September 6 ====
- 00:00 UTC (8:00 p.m. AST, September 5) – Hurricane Maria reaches Category 3 intensity and its peak strength with estimated sustained winds of near 120 mph (190 km/h) and a minimum barometric pressure of 962 mbar (28.41 inHg) about 480 mi (770 km) east of Bermuda.
- 00:00 UTC (8:00 p.m. EDT, September 5) – Tropical Depression Fifteen strengthens into Tropical Storm Nate south-southwest of Bermuda.
- 06:00 UTC (2:00 a.m. AST) – Hurricane Maria weakens to Category 2 intensity.
- 06:00 UTC (2:00 a.m. EDT) – Tropical Depression Sixteen forms over the northern Bahamas.
- 12:00 UTC (8:00 a.m. AST) – Hurricane Maria weakens to Category 1 intensity.
- 16:00 UTC (12:00 p.m. EDT) – Tropical Depression Sixteen's broad circulation center crosses Grand Bahama Island with 30 mph (48 km/h) winds.

==== September 7 ====
- 06:00 UTC (2:00 a.m. EDT) – Tropical Depression Sixteen strengthens into Tropical Storm Ophelia 115 mi (185 km) east-southeast of Cape Canaveral, Florida.
- 12:00 UTC (8:00 a.m. EDT) – Tropical Storm Nate intensifies into a hurricane about 260 mi (420 km) south-southwest of Bermuda.

==== September 8 ====
- 21:00 UTC (5:00 p.m. EDT) – Tropical Storm Ophelia intensifies into a hurricane while stationary about 70 mi (110 km) east-northeast of Cape Canaveral, and oscillates between hurricane and tropical storm strength several times over the ensuing several days.

==== September 9 ====
- 00:00 UTC (8:00 p.m. AST, September 8) – Hurricane Maria weakens to a tropical storm about 605 mi (974 km) southeast of Cape Race, Newfoundland.
- 00:00 UTC (8:00 p.m. AST, September 8) – Hurricane Nate attains its peak strength east of Bermuda with sustained winds of near 95 mph (153 km/h) and a minimum barometric pressure of 979 mbar (28.91 inHg).

==== September 10 ====
- 09:00 UTC (5:00 a.m. AST) – Tropical Storm Maria becoming extratropical roughly 735 mi (1,183 km) east-southeast of Cape Race, Newfoundland, and subsequently merges with another extratropical cyclone over the Norwegian Sea.
- 09:00 UTC (5:00 a.m. EDT) – Hurricane Ophelia attains a minimum pressure of 976 mbar (28.82 inHg) about 220 mi (350 km)south-southeast of Charleston, South Carolina.
- 18:00 UTC (2:00 p.m. EDT) – Tropical Storm Nate becomes extratropical about 810 mi (1,300 km) west of the Azores and later merges with a stationary front.

Hurricane Ophelia on September 14

==== September 14 ====
- 12:00 UTC (8:00 a.m. EDT) – Hurricane Ophelia attains its peak sustained wind speed of 75 knots (139 km/h; 86 mph) about 40 mi (64 km) miles south-southeast of Wilmington, North Carolina; its northern eyewall passed over the coast during this time.

==== September 15 ====
- 03:00 UTC (11:00 p.m. EDT, September 14) – Hurricane Ophelia passes about 20 mi (32 km) south-southeast of Cape Lookout, North Carolina, then moves generally to the east-northeast parallel to the Outer Banks.

==== September 16 ====
- 00:00 UTC (8:00 p.m. EDT, September 15) – Hurricane Ophelia weakens into a tropical storm for the last time.

==== September 17 ====
- 12:00 UTC (8:00 a.m. EDT) – Tropical Depression Seventeen forms 345 mi (555 km) east of Barbados.
- 18:00 UTC (2:00 p.m. EDT) – Tropical Depression Seventeen strengthens into Tropical Storm Philippe east of Barbados.

==== September 18 ====
- 00:00 UTC (8:00 p.m. EDT, September 17) – Tropical Depression Eighteen forms 80 mi (130 km) east of Grand Turk Island.
- 03:00 UTC (11:00 p.m. EDT, September 17) – Tropical Storm Ophelia becomes extratropical about 50 mi (80 km) south-southeast of Halifax, Nova Scotia, and subsequently dissipates over the North Sea.
- 18:00 UTC (2:00 p.m. EDT) – Tropical Depression Eighteen strengthens into Tropical Storm Rita about 30 mi (48 km) east-southeast of Mayaguana Island, Bahamas.

==== September 19 ====
- 00:00 UTC (8:00 p.m. EDT, September 18) – Tropical Storm Philippe intensifies to hurricane strength about 360 mi (580 km) east of the northern Leeward Islands.

==== September 20 ====
- 00:00 UTC (8:00 p.m. EDT, September 19) – Hurricane Philippe attains its peak strength with sustained winds of near 80 mph (130 km/h) and a minimum barometric pressure of 985 mbar (29.09 inHg).
- 12:00 UTC (8:00 a.m. EDT) – Hurricane Philippe weakens into a tropical storm east-northeast of the Leeward Islands.
- 12:00 UTC (8:00 a.m. EDT) – Tropical Storm Rita reaches hurricane strength about 120 mi (190 km) east-southeast of Key West, Florida.
- 18:00 UTC (2:00 p.m. EDT) – Hurricane Rita reaches Category 2 intensity about 50 mi (80 km) south of Key West.

==== September 21 ====
- 06:00 UTC (2:00 a.m. EDT) – Hurricane Rita reaches Category 3 intensity about 80 mi (130 km) west-southwest of Dry Tortugas.
- 12:00 UTC (8:00 a.m. EDT) – Hurricane Rita reaches Category 4 intensity about 195 mi (314 km) west of Key West.
- 18:00 UTC (2:00 p.m. CDT) – Hurricane Rita reaches Category 5 intensity.

==== September 22 ====
- 03:00 UTC (10:00 p.m. CDT, September 21) – Hurricane Rita attains its peak strength about 310 mi (500 km) south-southeast of the mouth of the Mississippi River with sustained winds of near 180 mph (290 km/h) and a minimum barometric pressure of 895 mbar (26.4 inHg).
- 18:00 UTC (1:00 p.m. CDT) – Hurricane Rita weakens to a Category 4 hurricane about 435 mi (700 km) southeast of Galveston, Texas.

==== September 23 ====
- 12:00 UTC (8:00 a.m. EDT) – Tropical Storm Philippe weakens into a tropical depression.
- 18:00 UTC (2:00 p.m. EDT) – Tropical Depression Philippe degenerates to a remnant low south-southeast of Bermuda, and later becomes embedded within a broader non-tropical low.
- 18:00 UTC (1:00 p.m. CDT) – Hurricane Rita weakens to a Category 3 hurricane about 160 mi (260 km) southeast of Sabine Pass.

Infrared satellite imagery of Hurricane Rita making landfall along the Texas and Louisiana Gulf Coast

==== September 24 ====
- 07:30 UTC (2:30 a.m. CDT) – Hurricane Rita makes landfall between Sabine Pass and Johnson Bayou, Louisiana with 120 mph (193 km/h) winds.
- 12:00 UTC (7:00 a.m. EDT) – Hurricane Rita weakens into a tropical storm about 40 mi (64 km) north of Beaumont, Texas.

==== September 25 ====
- 03:00 UTC (10:00 p.m. CDT, September 24) – Tropical Storm Rita weakens to a tropical depression about 40 mi (64 km) north of Shreveport, Louisiana.

==== September 26 ====
- 06:00 UTC (1:00 a.m. CDT) – Tropical Depression Rita degenerates to a remnant low over Southern Illinois and is later absorbed into a weather front.

==== September 30 ====
- 12:00 UTC (8:00 a.m. AST) – Tropical Depression Nineteen forms 665 mi (1,070 km) west-southwest of the Cape Verde Islands.

=== October ===
==== October 1 ====
- 00:00 UTC (8:00 p.m. AST, September 30) – Tropical Depression Nineteen reaches its peak intensity with sustained winds of 30 mph (48 km/h) and a minimum pressure of 1,006 mbar (29.71 inHg).
- 12:00 UTC (7:00 a.m. CDT) – Tropical Depression Twenty forms 130 mi (210 km) southeast of Cozumel, Quintana Roo.

==== October 2 ====
- 06:00 UTC (1:00 a.m. CDT) – Tropical Depression Twenty strengthens into Tropical Storm Stan just off the eastern coast of the Yucatán Peninsula.
- 10:00 UTC (5:00 a.m. CDT) – Tropical Storm Stan makes landfall about 40 mi (64 km) south of Tulum, Quintana Roo with 40 mph (64 km/h) winds.
- 15:00 UTC (11:00 a.m. AST) – Tropical Depression Nineteen dissipates about 780 mi (1,260 km) west of the Cape Verde Islands.

==== October 3 ====
- 00:00 UTC (7:00 p.m. CDT, October 2) – Tropical Storm Stan weakens into a tropical depression over the Yucatán Peninsula.
- 06:00 UTC (1:00 a.m. CDT) – Tropical Depression Stan regains tropical storm strength after emerging off the northwestern coast of the Yucatán Peninsula.

==== October 4 ====
- 06:00 UTC (1:00 a.m. CDT) – Tropical Storm Stan re-intensifies to hurricane strength about 135 mi (217 km) east of Veracruz, Veracruz.
- 06:00 UTC – A low pressure area in the eastern Atlantic gains some tropical characteristics and becomes a subtropical depression undetected.
- 12:00 UTC (7:00 a.m. CDT) – Hurricane Stan reaches its peak intensity with sustained winds of 80 mph (130 km/h) and a minimum pressure of 977 mbar (28.85 inHg) while making landfall about 90 mi (140 km) east-southeast of Veracruz.
- 12:00 UTC – The undetected subtropical depression strengthens undetected into a tropical storm in the eastern Atlantic.
- 18:00 UTC (1:00 p.m. CDT) – Hurricane Stan weakens into a tropical storm south-southeast of Veracruz.

==== October 5 ====
- 00:00 UTC (7:00 p.m. CDT, October 4) – Tropical Storm Stan weakens into a tropical depression and later dissipates over the Sierra Madre de Oaxaca.
- 06:00 UTC – The undetected subtropical storm becomes extratropical over the northeastern Atlantic.
- 06:00 UTC (2:00 a.m. EDT) – Tropical Storm Tammy forms 25 mi (40 km) east of Jupiter, Florida.
- 18:00 UTC (2:00 p.m. EDT) – Tropical Storm Tammy reaches its peak intensity with sustained winds of 50 mph (80 km/h) and a minimum pressure of 1,001 mbar (29.56 inHg).
- 23:00 UTC (7:00 p.m. EDT) – Tropical Storm Tammy makes landfall near Atlantic Beach, Florida with 50 mph (80 km/h) winds.

==== October 6 ====
- 12:00 UTC (8:00 a.m. EDT) – Tropical Storm Tammy weakens into a tropical depression over southern Georgia.

==== October 7 ====
- 00:00 UTC (7:00 p.m. CDT, October 6) – Tropical Depression Tammy degenerates into a remnant low pressure system over the Florida Panhandle and is later absorbed by a larger deep-layer extratropical low pressure system.

==== October 8 ====
- 06:00 UTC (2:00 a.m. EDT) – Subtropical Depression Twenty-two forms about 615 mi (990 km) southeast of Bermuda.
- 06:00 UTC (7:00 a.m. WEST) – Subtropical Storm Vince forms about 760 mi (1,220 km) southeast of Lajes, Azores.

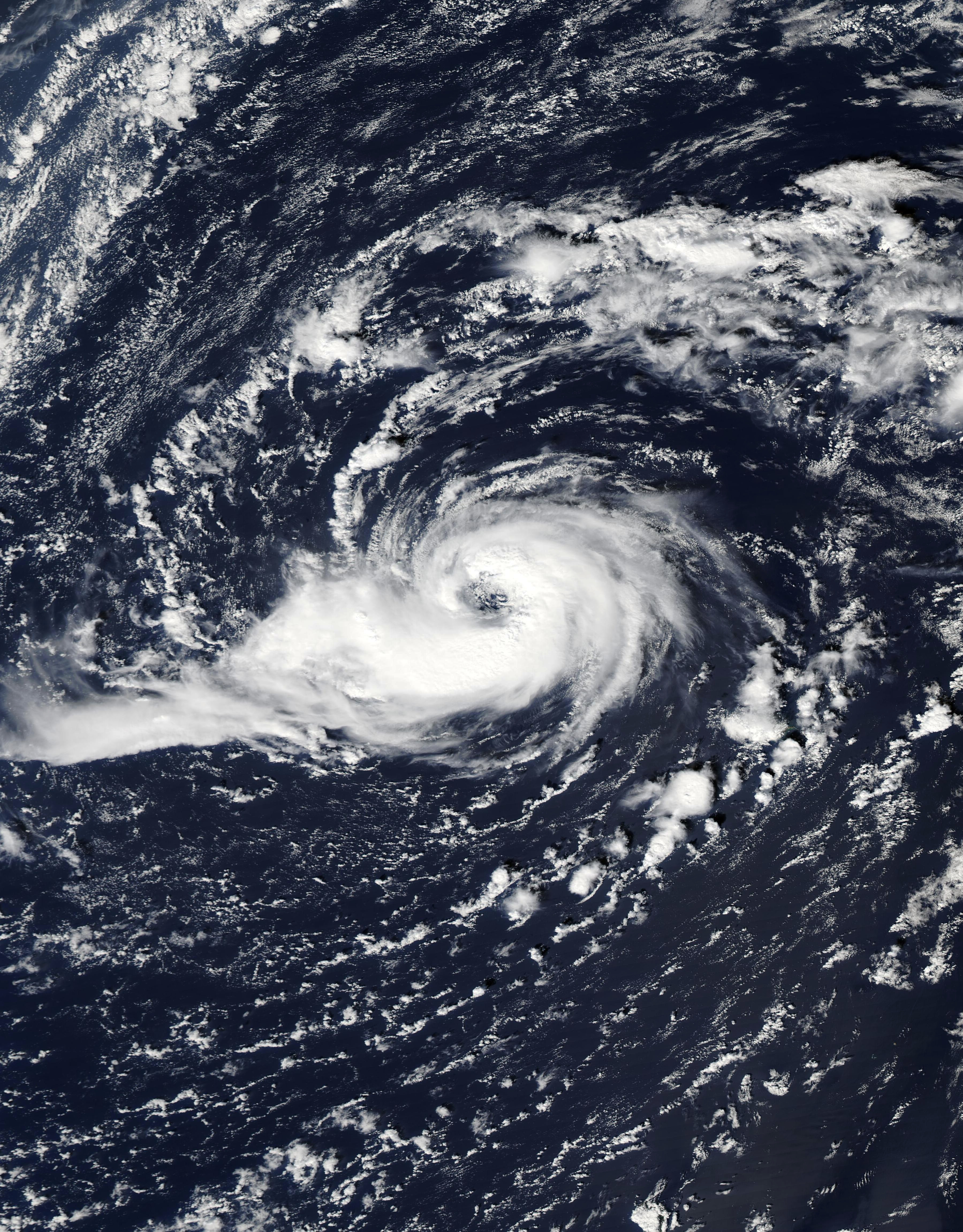
Hurricane Vince on October 9

==== October 9 ====
- 12:00 UTC (1:00 p.m. WEST) – Subtropical Storm Vince gains tropical characteristics and becomes Tropical Storm Vince.
- 18:00 UTC (7:00 p.m. WEST) – Tropical Storm Vince intensifies to hurricane strength about 155 mi (249 km) northwest of Funchal, Madeira Islands.

==== October 10 ====
- 00:00 UTC (2:00 a.m. CEST) – Hurricane Vince weakens to a tropical storm north-northwest of the Madeira Islands.
- 06:00 UTC (2: a.m. EDT) – Subtropical Depression Twenty-two degenerates into a remnant low and is late absorbed by a larger extratropical low.

==== October 11 ====
- 00:00 UTC (2:00 a.m. CEST) – Tropical Storm Vince weakens into a tropical depression about 155 mi (249 km) west-southwest of Faro, Portugal.
- 09:00 UTC (11:00 a.m. CEST) – Tropical Depression Vince makes landfall near Huelva, Spain, with 35 mph (56 km/h) winds.
- 09:00 UTC (11:00 a.m. CEST) – Tropical Depression Vince, the first recorded tropical cyclone to reach the Iberian Peninsula, begins to lose its tropical characteristics as it makes landfall and later dissipates over southern Spain.

==== October 15 ====
- 18:00 UTC (2:00 p.m. EDT) – Tropical Depression Twenty-four forms 220 mi (350 km) east-southeast of Grand Cayman.

==== October 17 ====
- 06:00 UTC (2:00 a.m. EDT) – Tropical Depression Twenty-four strengthens into Tropical Storm Wilma southeast of Grand Cayman.

==== October 18 ====
- 12:00 UTC (8:00 a.m. EDT) – Tropical Storm Wilma strengthens into Hurricane Wilma south-southeast of Grand Cayman.
- 19:00 UTC (2:00 p.m. EDT) – Hurricane Wilma reaches Category 2 intensity south of Grand Cayman.
- 21:00 UTC (5:00 p.m. EDT) – Hurricane Wilma reaches Category 3 intensity south of Grand Cayman.

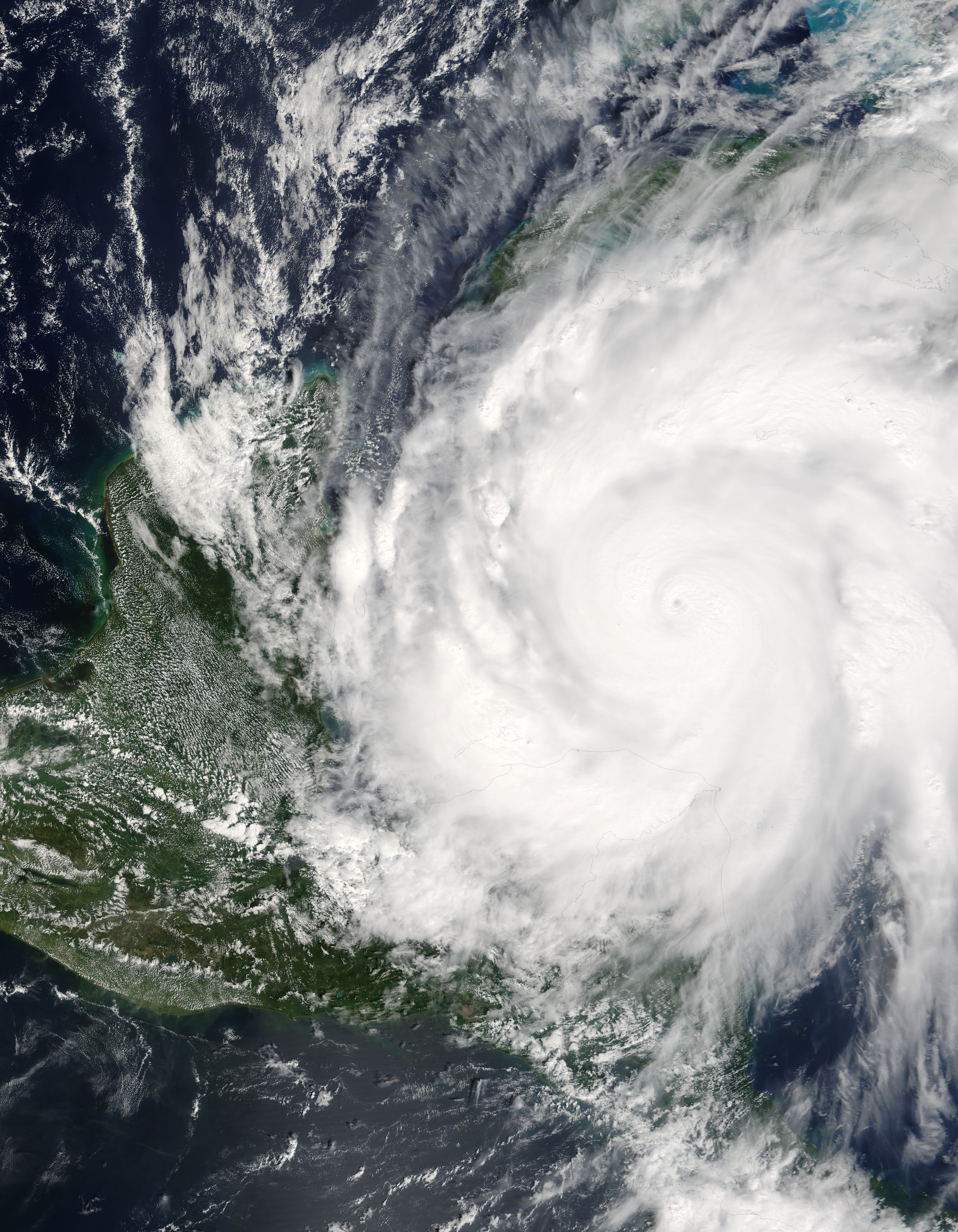
Hurricane Wilma at near peak intensity on October 20

==== October 19 ====
- 00:00 UTC (8:00 p.m. EDT, October 18) – Hurricane Wilma reaches Category 4 intensity south of Grand Cayman.
- 06:00 UTC (2:00 a.m. EDT) – Hurricane Wilma reaches Category 5 intensity south-southwest of Grand Cayman.
- 12:00 UTC (8:00 a.m. EDT) – Hurricane Wilma reaches its peak intensity with sustained winds of 180 mph (290 km/h) and an Atlantic basin record central minimum pressure of 882 mbar (26.05 inHg).

==== October 20 ====
- 03:00 UTC (11:00 p.m. EDT, October 19) – Hurricane Wilma weakens slightly to Category 4 intensity about 235 mi (378 km) southeast of Cozumel, Quintana Roo.

==== October 21 ====
- 21:45 UTC (4:45 p.m. CDT) – Hurricane Wilma makes landfall on the Island of Cozumel with 150 mph (240 km/h) winds.

==== October 22 ====
- 03:30 UTC (10:30 p.m. CDT, October 21) – Hurricane Wilma makes landfall at Puerto Morelos, Quintana Roo with 140 mph (230 km/h) winds.
- 12:00 UTC (8:00 a.m. EDT) – Tropical Depression Twenty-five forms southwest of San Juan Puerto Rico.
- 18:00 UTC (2:00 p.m. EDT) – Tropical Depression Twenty-five strengthens into Tropical Storm Alpha south-southeast of Hispaniola.

==== October 23 ====
- 00:00 UTC (7:00 p.m. CDT, October 22) – Hurricane Wilma emerges into the Gulf of Mexico as a Category 2 hurricane about 30 mi (48 km) north-northwest of Cancún, Quintana Roo.
- 06:00 UTC (2:00 a.m. EDT) – Tropical Storm Alpha reaches its maximum intensity with sustained winds of 50 mph (80 km/h) and a minimum pressure of 998 mbar (29.47 inHg) as it nears the coast of Hispaniola.
- 10:00 UTC (6:00 a.m. EDT) – Tropical Storm Alpha makes landfall near Barahona, Dominican Republic with 50 mph (80 km/h) winds.
- 18:00 UTC (2:00 p.m. EDT) – Tropical Storm Alpha weakens into a tropical depression in the high mountains of Hispaniola and is subsequently absorbed by the much larger circulation of Hurricane Wilma.

==== October 24 ====
- 06:00 UTC (2:00 a.m. EDT) – Hurricane Wilma re-intensifies to Category 3 west-northwest of Key West, Florida.
- 10:30 UTC (6:30 a.m. EDT) – Hurricane Wilma makes landfall near Cape Romano, Florida, with 120 mph (190 km/h) winds.
- 17:00 UTC (1:00 p.m. EDT) – Hurricane Wilma emerges into the Atlantic Ocean as a Category 2 hurricane about 65 mi (105 km) northeast of West Palm Beach, Florida.

==== October 25 ====
- 00:00 UTC (8:00 p.m. EDT, October 24) – Hurricane Wilma re-intensifies to Category 3 about 350 mi (560 km) south of Cape Hatteras, North Carolina.
- 15:00 UTC (11:00 a.m. EDT, October 24) – Hurricane Wilma weakens to Category 2 about 440 mi (710 km) south-southwest of Cape Halifax, Nova Scotia.

==== October 26 ====
- 00:00 UTC (8:00 p.m. EDT, October 25) – Hurricane Wilma becomes extratropical about 230 mi (370 km) southeast of Halifax and is later absorbed by another extratropical cyclone.
- 18:00 UTC (2:00 p.m. EDT) – Tropical Depression Twenty-six forms about 100 mi (160 km) north of the northern central coast of Panama.

==== October 27 ====
- 06:00 UTC (2:00 a.m. EDT) – Tropical Depression Twenty-six strengthens into Tropical Storm Beta about 85 mi (137 km) south of San Andrés Island.

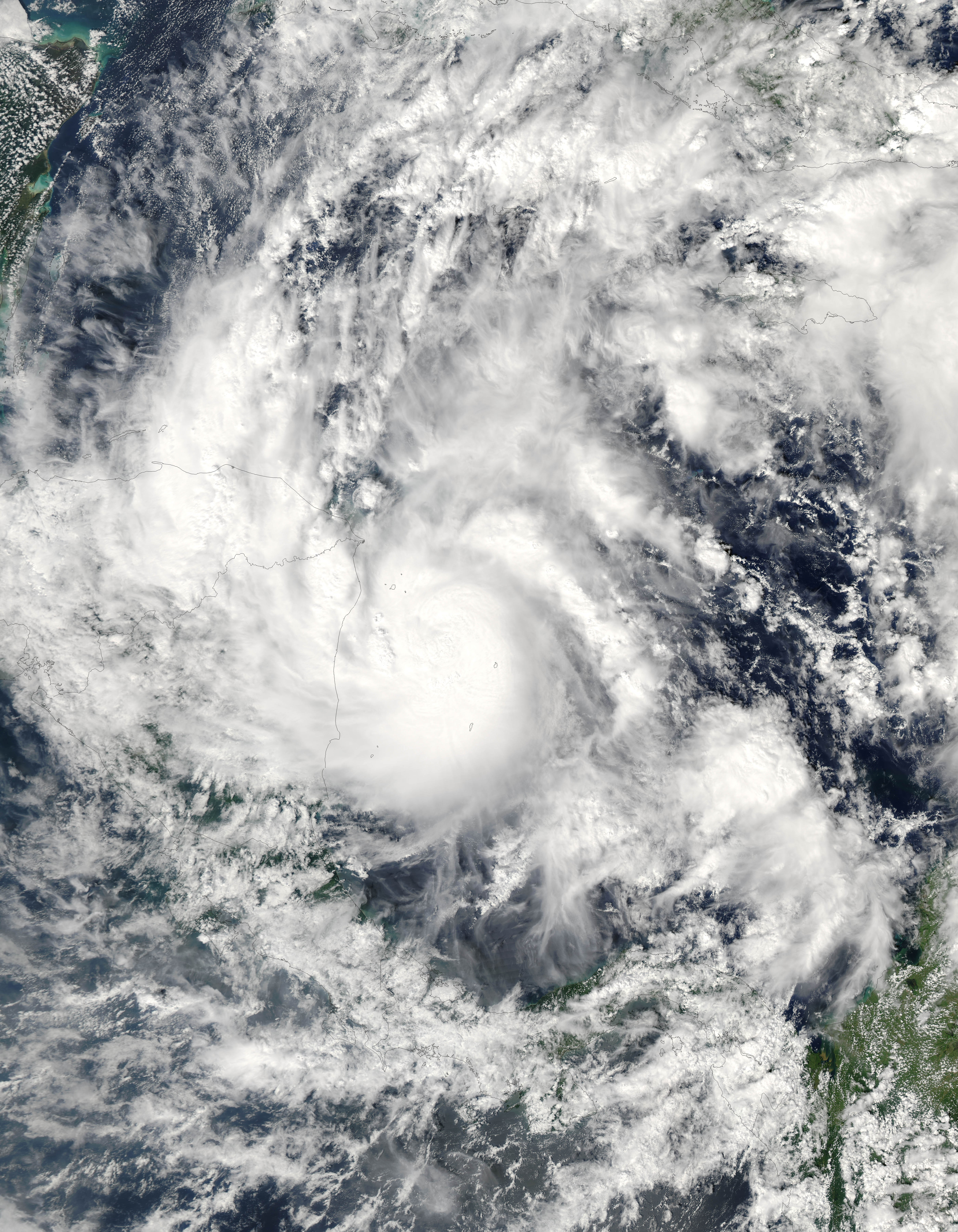
Hurricane Beta on October 29

==== October 29 ====
- 06:00 UTC (2:00 a.m. EDT) – Tropical Storm Beta intensifies to hurricane strength just northwest of Providencia Island.

==== October 30 ====
- 00:00 UTC (8:00 p.m. EDT, October 29) – Hurricane Beta reaches Category 2 intensity about 55 mi (89 km) east-southeast of Puerto Cabezas, Nicaragua.
- 06:00 UTC (1:00 a.m. EST) – Hurricane Beta intensifies to Category 3, simultaneously reaching its peak intensity with sustained winds of 120 mph (190 km/h) and a minimum pressure of 962 mbar (28.41 inHg).
- 12:00 UTC (7:00 a.m. EST) – Hurricane Beta makes landfall on the central coast of Nicaragua near La Barra del Río Grande, with 105 mph (169 km/h) winds.
- 18:00 UTC (1:00 p.m. EST) – Hurricane Beta weakens into a tropical storm inland, about 50 mi (80 km) north of Bluefields, Nicaragua.

==== October 31 ====
- 03:00 UTC (10:00 p.m. EST, October 30) – Tropical Storm Beta weakens into a tropical depression about 70 mi (110 km) east-northeast of Managua, and later dissipates over west-central Nicaragua.

=== November ===
==== November 14 ====
- 00:00 UTC (8:00 p.m. AST, November 13) – Tropical Depression Twenty-seven forms about 100 mi (160 km) west of St. Vincent.

==== November 15 ====
- 06:00 UTC (2:00 a.m. AST) – Tropical Depression Twenty-seven strengthens undetected into a tropical storm.
- 15:00 UTC (11:00 a.m. AST) – Tropical Storm Twenty-seven weakens to a tropical depression about 305 mi (491 km) south-southeast of San Juan, Puerto Rico.

==== November 16 ====
- 18:00 UTC (1:00 p.m. EST) – Tropical Depression Twenty-seven degenerates into a tropical wave about 305 mi (491 km) southeast of Jamaica.

==== November 18 ====
- 18:00 UTC (12:00 p.m. CST) – Remnants of Tropical Depression Twenty-seven regenerate into Tropical Storm Gamma along the northern coast of Honduras near Limón.

==== November 19 ====
- 12:00 UTC (6:00 a.m. CST) – Tropical Storm Gamma reaches its peak intensity just east of Roatán Island, Honduras, with maximum sustained winds of 52 mph (84 km/h) and a minimum barometric pressure of 1,002 mbar (29.59 inHg).

==== November 20 ====
- 12:00 UTC (7:00 a.m. EST) – Tropical Storm Gamma weakens to a tropical depression about 75 mi (121 km) north-northeast of Limón.

==== November 21 ====
- 03:00 UTC (10:00 p.m. EST, November 20) – Tropical Depression Gamma degenerates into a non-convective remnant low pressure system about 95 mi (153 km) north of Limón and later dissipates east of the Honduras–Nicaragua border.

==== November 22 ====
- 18:00 UTC (2:00 p.m. AST) – Subtropical Storm Delta forms about 870 mi (1,400 km) southwest of the Azores.

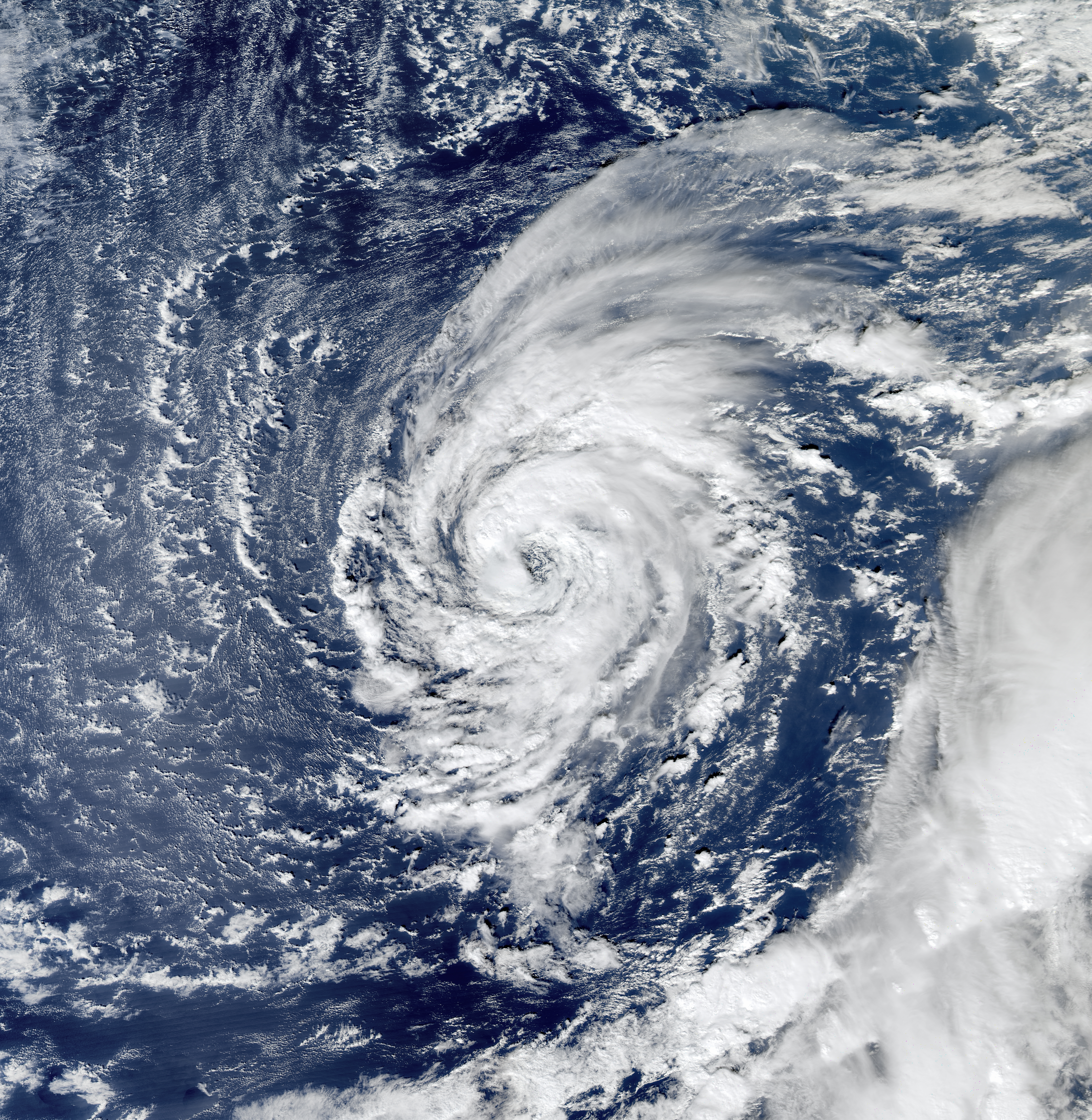
Tropical Storm Delta near peak intensity

==== November 23 ====
- 12:00 UTC (8:00 a.m. AST) – Subtropical Storm Delta gains tropical characteristics and becomes Tropical Storm Delta over the central Atlantic.

==== November 24 ====
- 12:00 UTC (8:00 a.m. AST) – Tropical Storm Delta reaches its peak intensity with maximum sustained winds of 69 mph (111 km/h) and a minimum barometric pressure of 980 mbar (28.94 inHg).

==== November 28 ====
- 12:00 UTC (8:00 a.m. AST) – Tropical Storm Delta becomes extratropical about 250 mi (400 km) west-northwest of the Canary Islands and subsequently dissipates over northwestern Algeria.

==== November 29 ====
- 06:00 UTC (2:00 a.m. AST) – Tropical Storm Epsilon forms east of Bermuda.

==== November 30 ====
- The 2005 Atlantic hurricane season officially ends.

=== December ===
Hurricane Epsilon displaying a classic annular structure while churning in the Central Atlantic

==== December 2 ====
- 18:00 UTC (2:00 p.m. AST) – Tropical Storm Epsilon intensifies to hurricane strength about 980 mi (1,580 km) east-northeast of Bermuda.

==== December 5 ====
- 06:00 UTC (2:00 a.m. AST) – Hurricane Epsilon reaches its peak intensity with maximum sustained winds of 86 mph (138 km/h) and a minimum barometric pressure of 981 mbar (28.97 inHg) over the eastern Atlantic.

==== December 7 ====
- 18:00 UTC (2:00 p.m. AST) – Hurricane Epsilon weakens into a tropical storm about 920 mi (1,480 km) southwest of the Azores.

==== December 8 ====
- 12:00 UTC (8:00 a.m. AST) – Tropical Storm Epsilon weakens into a tropical depression.
- 18:00 UTC (2:00 p.m. AST) – Tropical Depression Epsilon degenerates to a remnant low and later dissipates.

==== December 30 ====
- 00:00 UTC (8:00 p.m. AST, December 29) – Tropical Depression Thirty forms over the eastern Atlantic.
- 06:00 UTC (2:00 a.m. AST) – Tropical Depression Thirty strengthens into Tropical Storm Zeta.

=== January 2006 ===
==== January 1 ====
- 18:00 UTC (2:00 p.m. AST) – Tropical Storm Zeta attains its peak intensity with sustained winds of 65 mph (105 km/h) and a barometric pressure of 994 hPa (29.35 inHg) about 1,035 mi (1,666 km) northwest of the Cape Verde Islands.

==== January 6 ====
- 06:00 UTC (2:00 a.m. AST) – Tropical Storm Zeta weakens into a tropical depression.
- 18:00 UTC (2:00 p.m. AST) – Tropical Depression Zeta degenerates into a remnant low which subsequently dissipates southeast of Bermuda, bringing the 2005 Atlantic hurricane season to a close.

== See also ==
- Timeline of Hurricane Katrina
- Timeline of the 2005 Pacific hurricane season
- Timeline of the 2005 Pacific typhoon season
