= Hurricane Epsilon (2005) =

Category 1 Atlantic hurricane in 2005

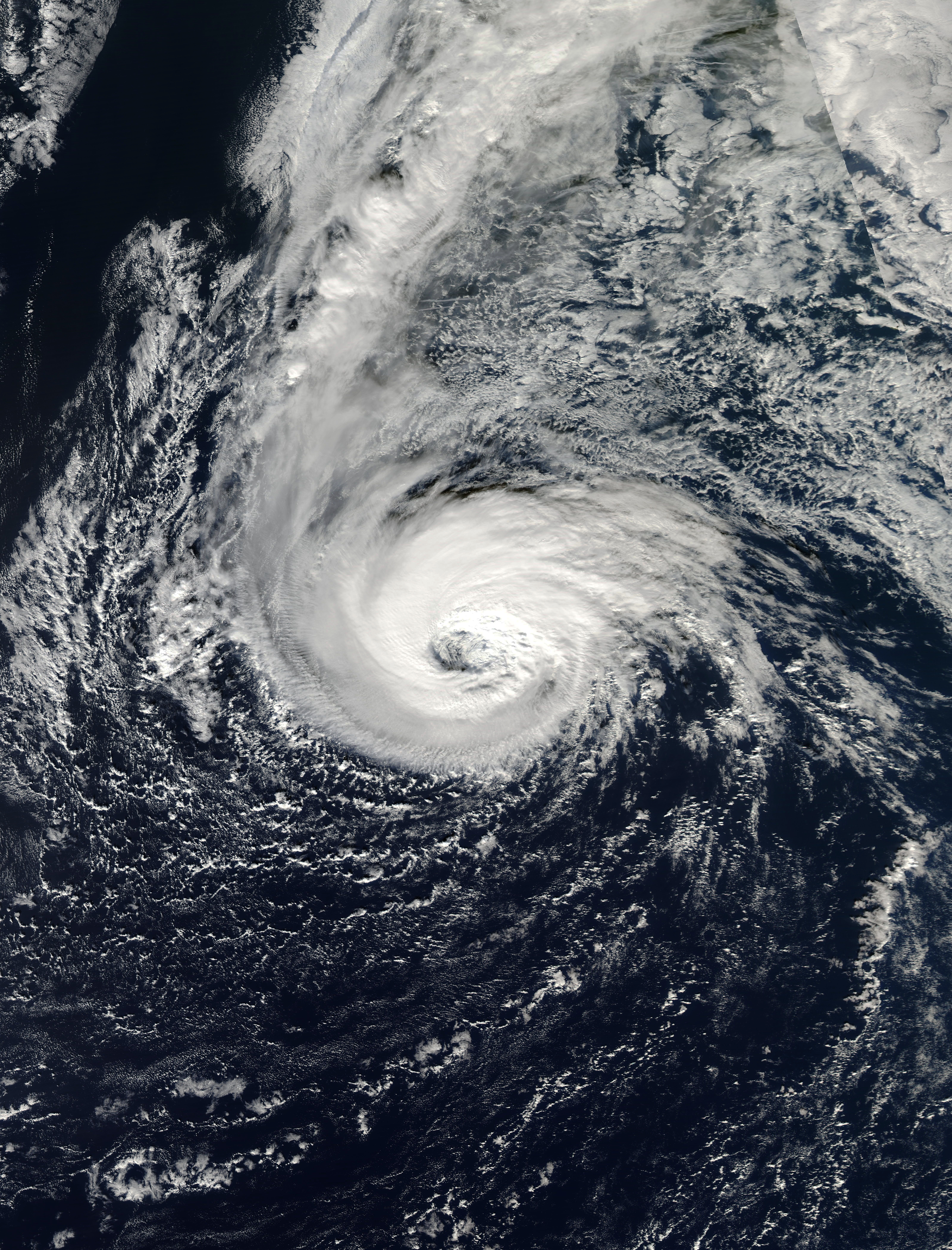
- Epsilon shortly after peak intensity on December 5

Meteorological history
- Formed: November 29, 2005
- Remnant low: December 8, 2005
- Dissipated: December 10, 2005

Category 1 hurricane
- 1-minute sustained (SSHWS/NWS)
- Highest winds: 85 mph (140 km/h)
- Lowest pressure: 981 mbar (hPa); 28.97 inHg

Overall effects
- Fatalities: None
- Damage: None
- IBTrACS
- Part of the 2005 Atlantic hurricane season

Hurricane Epsilon was the twenty-seventh named tropical or subtropical storm and the final of 15 hurricanes in the record-breaking 2005 Atlantic hurricane season. Originating from a cold front beneath an upper-level low, Epsilon formed on November 29 about 915 mi (1,473 km) east of Bermuda, becoming the second tropical storm to do so in that area of the Atlantic within the span of a week. Initially, the National Hurricane Center (NHC) forecast the storm to transition into an extratropical cyclone within five days, due to conditions unfavorable for significant intensification. Epsilon continually defied forecasts, at first due to an unexpected loop to the southwest, and later due to retaining its strength despite cold waters and strong wind shear.

Epsilon persisted into December, extending the 2005 season beyond its stated November 30 end date. On December 1, it began a northeast motion due to an approaching trough, and the next day it attained hurricane status. After turning to the east, it developed characteristics of an annular hurricane, meaning it had a circular eye, a ring of intense convection, and had few fluctuations in its intensity. On December 5, Epsilon attained peak winds of 85 mph (137 km/h), and the next day it turned to the south and southwest. Late on December 7, the winds dropped below hurricane status for the first time in five days, making Epsilon the longest-lasting December hurricane on record. Stronger wind shear caused rapid weakening, and the storm could no longer be classified as a tropical cyclone late on December 8. The next day the remnant circulation of Epsilon dissipated. Since Epsilon stayed well out to sea and never approached land, no warnings or watches were issued. No ships reported tropical storm force winds from Epsilon and there were no damages or fatalities.

== Meteorological history ==
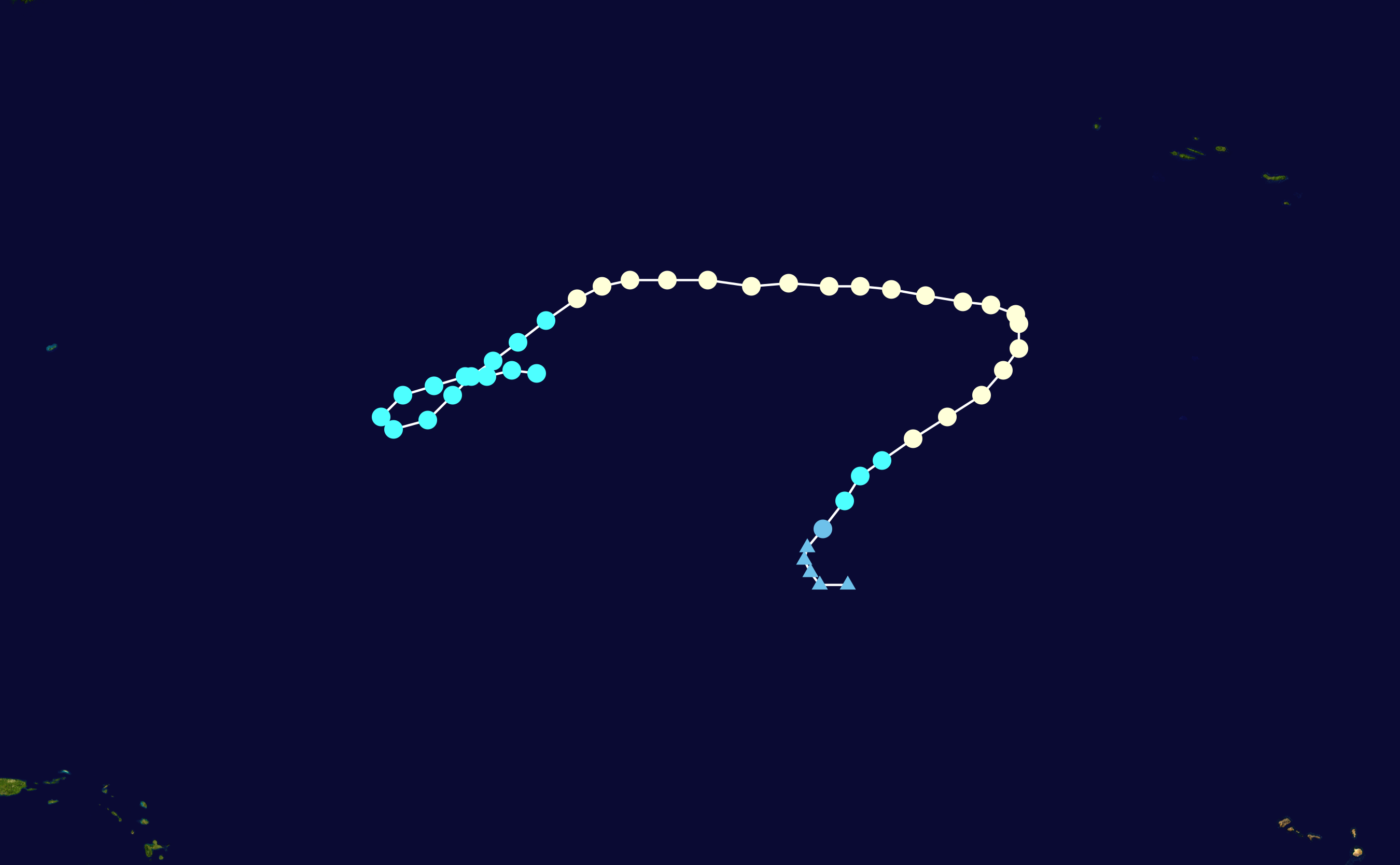
Map plotting the storm's track and intensity, according to the Saffir–Simpson scale Map key Saffir–Simpson scale Tropical depression (≤38 mph, ≤62 km/h) Tropical storm (39–73 mph, 63–118 km/h) Category 1 (74–95 mph, 119–153 km/h) Category 2 (96–110 mph, 154–177 km/h) Category 3 (111–129 mph, 178–208 km/h) Category 4 (130–156 mph, 209–251 km/h) Category 5 (≥157 mph, ≥252 km/h) Unknown Storm type Tropical cyclone Subtropical cyclone Extratropical cyclone, remnant low, tropical disturbance, or monsoon depression

On November 27, a surface storm with gale-force winds developed beneath an upper-level low pressure area, about 1,150 mi (1,850 km) east of Bermuda. At the time, a cold front extended eastward from the surface storm toward the eastern Atlantic Ocean, north of Tropical Storm Delta. By that time, tropical cyclone forecast models anticipated the possible development of a subtropical cyclone, and although they were inconsistent, National Hurricane Center (NHC) specialist Eric Blake stated, "blocking at high latitudes seems to favor another subtropical cyclone effort." The blocking referred to a ridge stretching across the northern Atlantic. The surface storm gradually separated from the frontal zone, but initially its convection, or thunderstorm activity, was sparse and poorly organized. The NHC introduced the system in its tropical weather outlook on November 28, with the possibility of subtropical or tropical development noted. It moved slowly westward, becoming better organized, and by late that day resembled a subtropical cyclone; however, as it was still connected to the cold front, it could not have been classified as such. Early on November 29, an area of deep convection developed and organized over the surface center when it was about 915 mi (1,473 km) east of Bermuda. The NHC accordingly assessed the system as developing into a tropical storm, designating it with the Greek letter Epsilon. Operationally, the NHC did not initiate advisories until 1500 UTC on November 29, about nine hours after it actually developed. By that time, the convection had wrapped into a ring 45 mi (72 km) in diameter. In the first advisory on Epsilon, the NHC forecast steady strengthening to near hurricane status due to marginally favorable conditions, followed by extratropical transition within five days; an alternate possibility was Epsilon being absorbed by a larger extratropical storm.

Epsilon moved westward after its development, steered by a ridge to its north. Initially, Epsilon was embedded beneath an upper-level low that provided an area of low wind shear and instability. An eye-like feature briefly developed in the center of the convection, although the thunderstorms waned late on November 28 due to restricted inflow. However, banding features and outflow improved at the same time. By November 30, the NHC anticipated extratropical transition to occur within two days, although some strengthening was still expected. That day, there was an increase in convection over the center of a ragged eye-feature. The winds briefly increased to 65 mph (105 km/h), although the intensity of the thunderstorms diminished. Initially Epsilon was predicted to continue westward and eventually turn to the north and northeast. Instead, it turned toward the southwest and executed a cyclonic loop; the unexpected motion caused larger than normal errors in the extended track forecast. As it moved to the south, the storm crossed over an area of warmer water temperatures, and the NHC remarked that "just a modest increase in convection [would be] needed to make Epsilon a hurricane." At the time, forecasters assessed the winds in Epsilon to be around 70 mph (115 km/h), although in a post-season re-analysis it was found to have been 10 mph (15 km/h) weaker. Late on November 30, Epsilon made its closest approach to Bermuda, passing about 645 miles (1,038 km) east-southeast of the island.

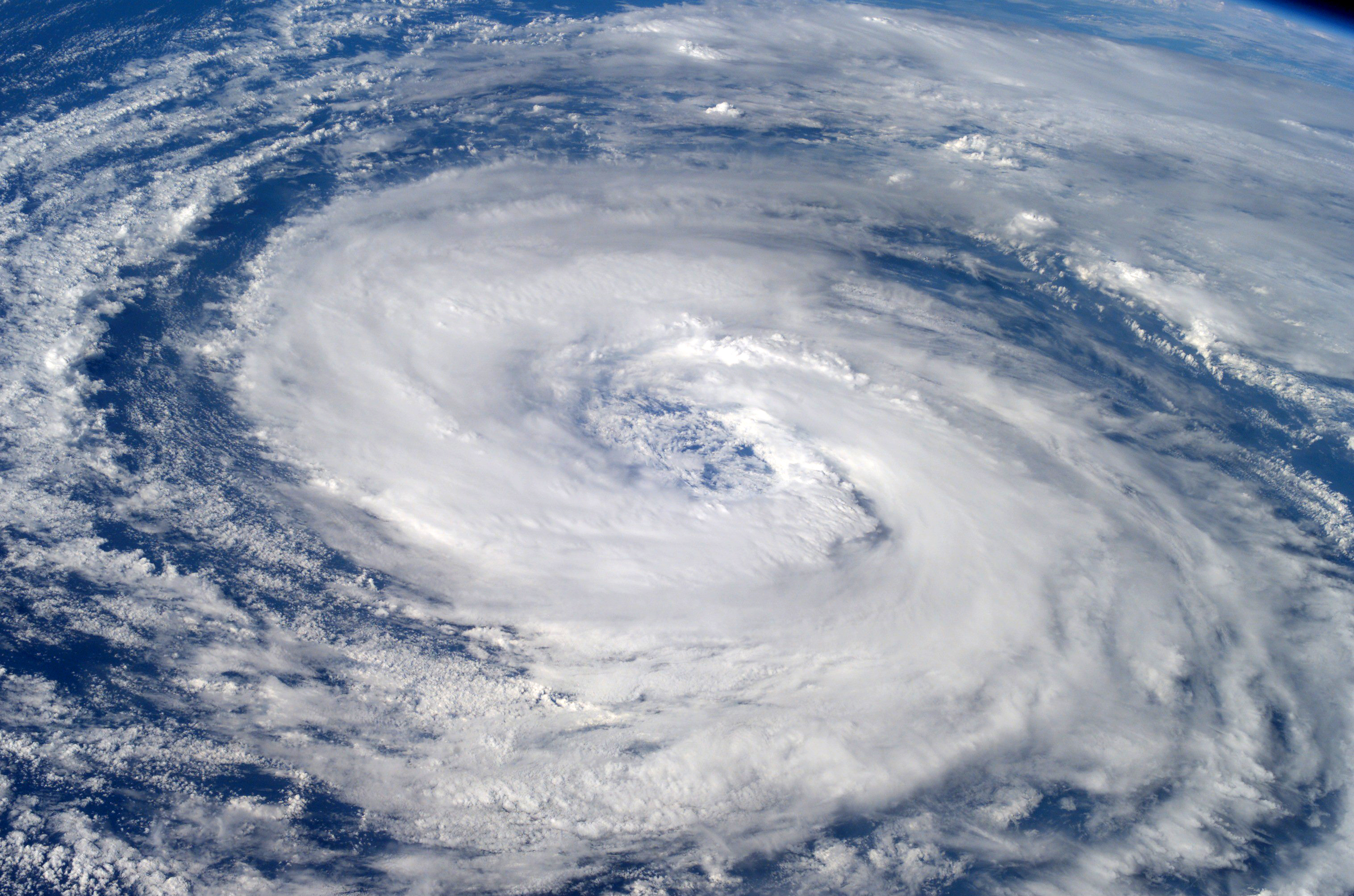
Hurricane Epsilon viewed from the International Space Station on December 3

Tropical Storm Epsilon began its motion to the east and northeast on December 1, due to an approaching trough. Its structure became that of a "shallow hybrid-type tropical cyclone", and an eye-feature again developed within the convection. At the time, the NHC and several computer models anticipated extratropical transition within 36 hours as it accelerated northeastward near the Azores. However, four computer models predicted an alternate scenario, and forecaster Stacy Stewart stated such transition would only occur "barring any southward motion over warmer water that would prolong both the lifetime of Epsilon and the 2005 Atlantic hurricane season." As it continued northeastward, the storm separated from upper-level low it was previously beneath. After a decrease in convection, the thunderstorm activity again increased over the center, and there were more banding features. Despite moving over slightly cooler water temperatures, Epsilon attained hurricane status late on December 2, following the development of a well-defined eye 29 miles (47 km) in diameter. A few hours after reaching hurricane status, the NHC thought Epsilon reached peak winds, as the storm was about to move over cooler water temperatures. Additionally, the hurricane was expected to stall near the Azores, in contrast to the original forecast of continued acceleration to the northeast. On December 3 it turned due eastward, still maintaining an eye, modest amounts of convection, and outflow. Despite moving into an area of cooler waters and generally unfavorable atmospheric conditions, Epsilon retained its hurricane status; the only entity supporting its intensity was its warm upper-level temperature. By late on December 3, its presentation was described as "remarkably well-organized for a hurricane at high latitude in December... embedded in a strong upper-level westerly wind environment and moving over [70–72 °F (21–22 °C)] water."

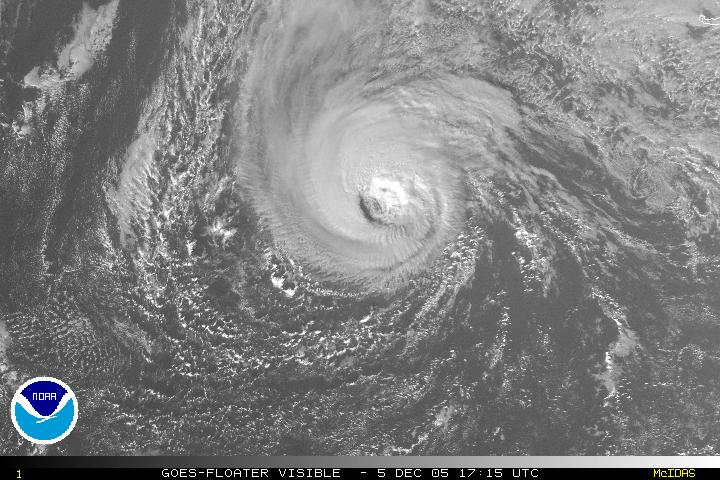
Hurricane Epsilon shortly after peak intensity on December 5

As it continued eastward, Epsilon developed characteristics of an annular hurricane; such cyclones, more often found in the deep tropics with greater intensity, have circular eyes, surrounded by a nearly uniform ring of convection and a general lack of thunderstorms outside the ring. For several days, the intensity fluctuated in a narrow range, and although Epsilon was briefly downgraded to tropical storm status on December 4, the NHC assessed it as remaining a hurricane. After it was thought to have weakened, the eye became more symmetric as the ring of convection became stronger. The hurricane remained difficult to forecast, as NHC forecaster Lixion Avila remarked, "There are no clear reasons... and I am not going to make one up... to explain the recent strengthening of Epsilon." By late on December 4, the NHC was no longer anticipating extratropical transition, after a front passed north of the storm and there was no interaction. At 0600 UTC on December 5, the hurricane's appearance generated 4.7 on the Dvorak technique, a system used to estimate intensity from satellite imagery. This was the highest rating during Epsilon's duration, and suggested winds of 85 mph (137 km/h), its peak intensity. Around that time, the hurricane began a turn to the east-southeast, as the ridge to its north built behind the passage of a cold front. Despite the cold water temperatures and unfavorable strong upper-level winds, Epsilon maintained its intensity, and the Geophysical Fluid Dynamics Laboratory (GFDL) model predicted it would remain a hurricane for nearly three days.

On December 6 the hurricane turned to the south and southwest. As it did so, Epsilon passed beneath a mid-level trough that sheltered it from the wind shear. After weakening during the evening, the convection redeveloped around the large and distinct eye in the daytime, a process Epsilon had done repeatedly in its duration. However, late on December 7, an approaching trough began increasing wind shear over the system, displacing the convection from the center and causing the eye to dissipate. After maintaining hurricane status for five days, Epsilon weakened to tropical storm status about 920 mi (1,480 km) southwest of the Azores. Once weakened to a tropical storm, Epsilon began rapidly deteriorating. On December 8, it was downgraded to a tropical depression as the convection had totally dissipated. The NHC issued their final advisory on Epsilon at 1500 UTC that day, after the cyclone consisted of a tight swirl of low clouds with no convection. On issuing the last advisory, Lixion Avila remarked, "I hope this is the end of the long lasting 2005 hurricane season." There was ultimately one more tropical storm – Zeta. Late on December 8, Epsilon transitioned into a remnant low pressure area. The remnant circulation elongated in advance of a frontal zone, and it dissipated late on December 9. The front absorbed the remnants the next day.

== Records ==
- Epsilon established a record formation date for the season's 27th tropical or subtropical storm, a mark that stood until 2020, when Hurricane Zeta formed on October 25.
- Epsilon is one of only four Atlantic storms since 1851 that have attained hurricane status in December, along with an unnamed storm in 1887, Alice in 1954, and Lili in 1984.
- Epsilon maintained hurricane status for five days, longer than any other Atlantic hurricane in December.

== See also ==
- Tropical cyclones in 2005
- List of off-season Atlantic hurricanes
- List of Category 1 Atlantic hurricanes
- Timeline of the 2005 Atlantic hurricane season
