= Lixion Avila =

American meteorologist (born 1950)

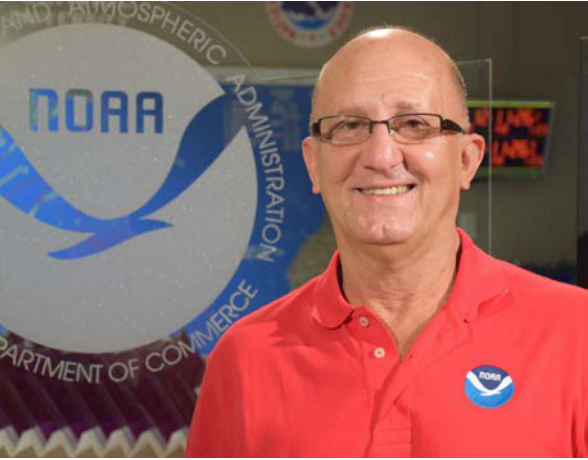
- Avila in 2017
- Born: November 25, 1950; Cuba
- Alma mater: University of Havana; University of Miami
- Occupation: Meteorologist (1973–2020)
- Employer: National Hurricane Center (1987–2020)

Lixion A. Avila (born November 25, 1950) is a retired weather forecaster, formerly working at the National Hurricane Center (NHC). He was a hurricane specialist and senior hurricane specialist from 1987 to 2020.

== Biography ==
Avila was born and raised in Cuba. He studied and received his Bachelor of Science degree in meteorology from the University of Havana in 1973, then worked for Cuba's weather service for seven years.

Avila was not able to study further in Cuba and with some help from his mother's family emigrated to the United States.

He was hired as a consultant for the National Hurricane Center in 1983, providing warning information in Spanish for the radio and television press. He obtained his MSc degree in 1987 at the University of Miami and became a forecaster at the NHC, graduating to hurricane specialist in 1989. Continuing his studies further, he obtained a PhD in 1993. Avila represented the National Hurricane Center at the World Meteorological Organization, especially for the coordination and training in the Caribbean and Central American region.

Avila retired from the NHC on April 30, 2020, after working at the agency for 33 years.

== Awards ==
Avila is a Fellow of the American Meteorological Society. In 2000, Avila received a NOAA Administrator's Award. In 2005, the National Weather Service bestowed him the Isaac M. Cline National Award for Outreach.

== Style ==
Avila generally forecasts with a quirky personal touch. Similar to his NHC counterpart James Franklin, Avila occasionally expresses his opinion or sense of humor, often in the discussion areas of advisories. For instance, during 2005's record-breaking Hurricane Epsilon, he expressed his frustration at the hurricane's refusal to weaken despite repeated predictions that it would do so: "There are no clear reasons...and I am not going to make one up...to explain the recent strengthening of Epsilon and I am just describing the facts." He further signed off this discussion with, "...Epsilon will likely become a remnant low. I heard that before about Epsilon... Haven't you?"

While describing Hurricane Leslie, in 2018, he quipped, "It is difficult to add more to the discussion about a cyclone that has moved very little during the past few days and has not changed significantly in structure either."
