= James Franklin (meteorologist) =

Former weather forecaster with NOAA

James Louis Franklin
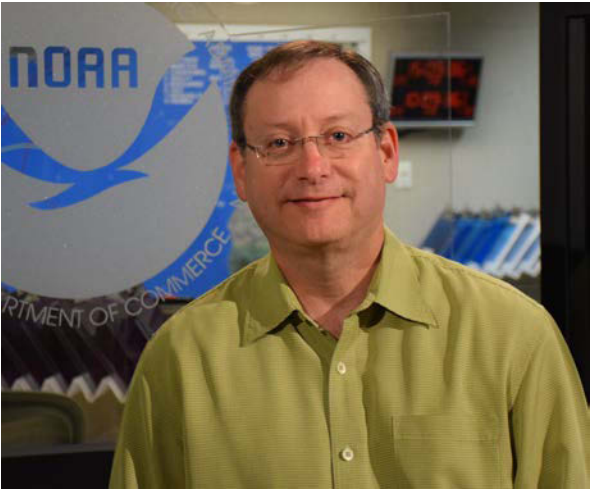
- Franklin at the National Hurricane Center.
- Born: 1958 (age 67–68)
- Education: Massachusetts Institute of Technology
- Occupation: Meteorologist
- Years active: 35
- Employer: NOAA
- Organization: Hurricane Specialist Unit
- Known for: Hurricanes, meteorology, dropsonde, Hurricane Forecast Improvement Project

James Louis Franklin is a former weather forecaster encompassing a 35-year career with National Oceanic and Atmospheric Administration (NOAA). He served as the first branch chief of the newly formed Hurricane Specialist Unit (HSU) before his retirement in 2017.

== Education and career ==
Franklin graduated from the Ransom Everglades School in Miami, where he was a co-valedictorian in 1976 before going on to graduate with a Master of Science from Massachusetts Institute of Technology (MIT) in 1984.

Most of his career was dedicated to developing better ways to more accurately predict hurricane intensity. In an interview as branch chief, he stated that it is much easier to predict the trajectory of a hurricane than the intensity of a hurricane due to a "lack of understanding of how the physical processes work, lack of observations of the small-scale features that are controlling intensity, and to some extent the models are not advanced enough." Moreover, in 2012 Franklin said “predicting storm intensity requires knowing lots of small-scale details that computer models have trouble capturing, from the dynamics of a storm’s structure to the characteristics of air masses being pulled into a storm’s circulation.”

Beginning as a student at MIT and early on in his career, he helped develop a device, dropsonde, designed to be dropped from an aircraft to measure atmospheric conditions as it falls to earth. In 1982, the U.S. Air Force Reserve Command hurricane hunters began using an Omega-based dropsonde to measure the atmospheric pressure, temperature, relative humidity, wind speed and the direction of hurricanes. Installing GPS location equipment improved hurricane intensity forecast accuracy by directly measuring the eyewall characteristics.

Franklin then contributed to the Automated Tropical Cyclone Forecasting System (ATCF), hurricane forecasting software, developed by the Naval Research Laboratory which has been used by the Joint Typhoon Warning Center (JTWC) since 1987 and the National Hurricane Center (NHC) since 1990. His career with the NHC also contributed to developing 5-day forecasts, which became standard for hurricanes predicted to make landfall in the U.S. Additionally, 3-day accuracy of hurricane trajectory forecasting improved by reducing the prediction uncertainty from 518 miles in 1970 to 48 miles. Further advances in hurricane forecasting came with the Hurricane Forecasting Improvement Program (HFIP), with specific goals to reduce the average errors of hurricane track and intensity forecasts by 20% within five years and 50% in ten years with a forecast period out to 7 days. While the HFIP was on track to meet these objectives, particularly with the Hurricane Weather Research and Forecasting Model, a budget decrease threatened to impede the objectives of the program. Success of the HFIP can be partially attributed to the Doppler weather radar measurements taken from aircraft flying into hurricanes.

Franklin accepted the science of meteorology, but recognized the limitations of the Saffir–Simpson scales in communicating the dangers of hurricanes. While overseeing the HSU, he tried to emphasize all the hazards of a hurricane, most importantly the storm surge. During Hurricane Sandy, the storm was predicted to weaken to a post-tropical cyclone before landfall on the Eastern U.S. coastline. Downgrading the hurricane could have minimized the public's storm preparation but was the best forecast given the evidence. Ultimately, retaining the status as a hurricane for public messaging “would have utterly destroyed the credibility of the agency in the long run,” Franklin said. Franklin also supported an approach to move the start date of the hurricane season from June 1 to an earlier date. A start date of June 1 would have only missed 3.1% of U.S. landfalls with wind speeds exceeding 39 mph between 1971 and 2018. Meanwhile, a start date of May 15 would have captured all but one out of 162 U.S. storms in the same timeframe. However, Franklin cautioned against moving the date even earlier to May 1, due to concerns over public safety and a lack of preparedness during the peak of the season.

In 2007, Franklin, along with twenty-two other staff members, signed a letter to remove its current director, William Proenza, stating “The effective functioning of the National Hurricane Center is at stake.”. The staff were critical of Proenza's unscientific claim over the impact of a weather satellite on forecasting performance.

== Forecast style ==
Franklin, much like his counterpart Lixion Avila, would add his own commentary to the forecast. Some examples are below.

- In forecasting 2002 Atlantic hurricane season's Hurricane Kyle, Franklin noted "for fun, [a] long-range run of the GFS [model] has Kyle — its decayed remnants actually — reaching south Florida just in time for the kickoff of the Miami/Florida State game, one week from tomorrow." Later, as the storm deteriorated, Franklin began his forecast discussion with a line from the Bee Gees' song "Stayin' Alive".
- When forecasting Tropical Storm Franklin in 2005, Franklin wrote "Franklin — the storm, not the forecaster — has become a little better organized overnight. [...] It is quite possible that little or nothing will be left of Franklin — the storm, not the forecaster — in 2–3 days."
- In the Tropical Cyclone Report for Hurricane Vince in 2005, Franklin alluded to My Fair Lady when he quipped "The rain in Spain was mainly less than 2 inches, although 3.30 inches fell in the plain at Cordoba."
- In a discussion for Tropical Depression Ana in 2009, Franklin noted that "[t]he intensity forecast is complicated by the uncertain existence of an actual tropical cyclone..."

== Recognition ==
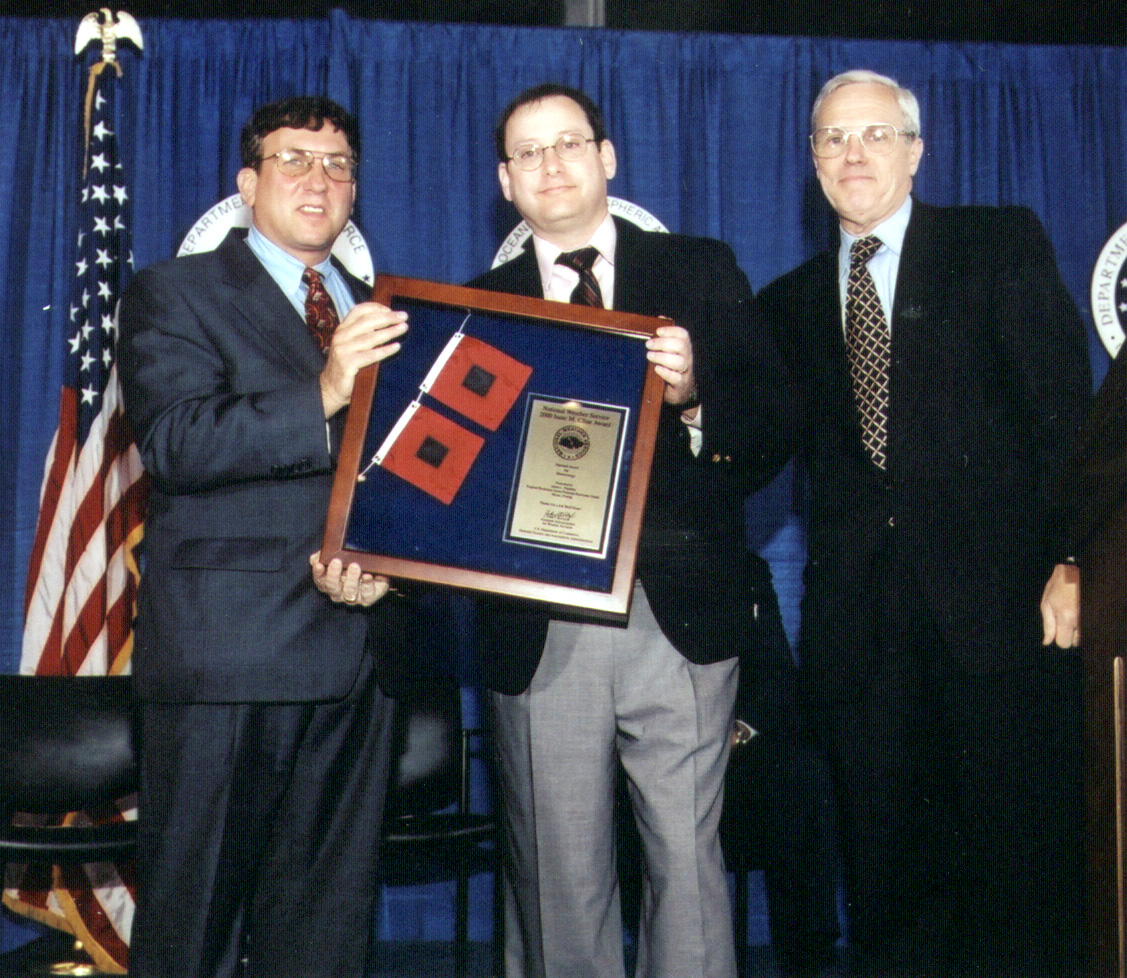
Franklin (middle) receiving the Isaac M. Cline Award with Scott Gudes (left) and retired Air Force General Jack Kelly, director of NWS.

Issac M. Cline award in 2001.

== Selected publications ==
- Velden C, Hayden CM, Menzel WP, Franklin JL, Lynch JS (1991). "The Impact of Satellite-derived Winds on Numerical Hurricane Track Forecasting". Weather and Forecasting. 7 (1): 107–118.
- Aberson SD, Franklin JL (1999). "Impact on Hurricane Track and Intensity Forecasts of GPS Dropwindsonde Observations from the First-Season Flights of the NOAA Gulfstream-IV Jet Aircraft". Bulletin of the American Meteorological Society. 80 (3): 421–428.
- Hock TF, Franklin JL (1999). "The NCAR GPS Dropwindsonde", Bulletin of the American Meteorological Society. 93 (3): 407–420.
- Franklin JL, McAdie CJ, Lawrence MB (2003). "Trends in Track Forecasting for Tropical Cyclones Threatening the United States, 1970–2001", Bulletin of the American Meteorological Society. 84 (9): 1197–1203.
- Rappaport EN, Franklin JL, Avila LA, Baig SR, Beven JL, Blake ES, Burr CA, Jiing JG, Juckins CA, Knabb, RD, Landsea CW, Mainelli M, Mayfield M, McAdie CJ, Pasch RJ, Sisko C, Stewart SR, and Tribble AN (2009). "Advances and Challenges at the National Hurricane Center", Weather and Forecasting. 24 (2): 395–419.
- Rappaport EN, Jiing JG, Landsea CW, Murillo ST, Franklin JL (2012). "The Joint Hurricane Test Bed: Its First Decade of Tropical Cyclone Research-To-Operations Activities Reviewed". Bulletin of the American Meteorological Society. 93 (3): 371–380.
- Franklin JL, McAdie CJ, Lawrence MB (2013). "The Hurricane Forecast Improvement Project". Bulletin of the American Meteorological Society. 94 (3): 329–343.
- Penny AB, Simon A, DeMaria M, Franklin JL, Pasch RJ, Rappaport EN, and Zelinsky DA (2018). "A Description of the Real-Time HFIP Corrected Consensus Approach (HCCA) for Tropical Cyclone Track and Intensity Guidance", Weather and Forecasting. 33 (1): 37–57.

== See also ==
- National Hurricane Center
- National Centers for Environmental Prediction
- National Center for Atmospheric Research
- Hurricane hunters
- Dropsonde
- Saffir–Simpson scale
- Weather forecasting
- Tropical cyclone forecasting
