= Hurricane Flora =

Category 4 Atlantic hurricane in 1963

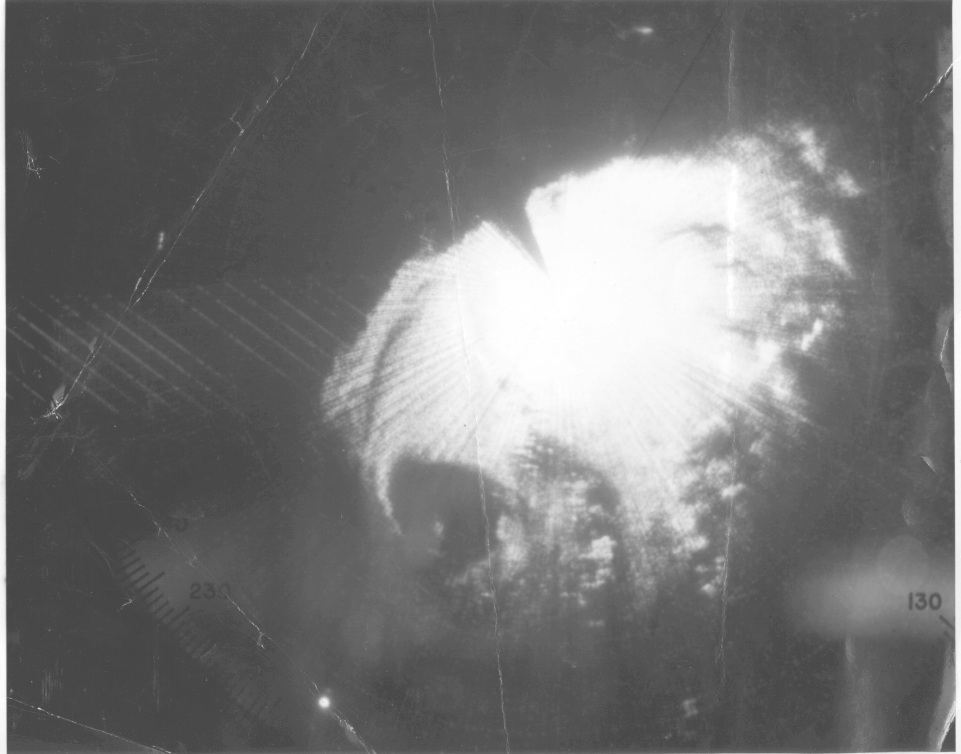
- Radar image of Flora over the Sargasso Sea as viewed from the USS Albany on October 9

Meteorological history
- Formed: September 28, 1963
- Extratropical: October 12, 1963
- Dissipated: October 17, 1963

Category 4 major hurricane
- 1-minute sustained (SSHWS/NWS)
- Highest winds: 150 mph (240 km/h)
- Lowest pressure: 933 mbar (hPa); 27.55 inHg

Overall effects
- Fatalities: 7,193 (Fifth-deadliest Atlantic hurricane on record)
- Damage: $773 million (1963 USD)
- Areas affected: Northern South America, Lesser Antilles, Greater Antilles, Lucayan Archipelago, Bermuda, Eastern Canada
- IBTrACS
- Part of the 1963 Atlantic hurricane season

Hurricane Flora was an extremely deadly and devastating tropical cyclone that is among the deadliest Atlantic hurricanes in recorded history, with a death total of at least 7,193. The seventh tropical storm and sixth hurricane of the 1963 Atlantic hurricane season, Flora developed from a disturbance in the Intertropical Convergence Zone on September 26 while located 755 miles (1,215 km) southwest of the Cape Verde islands. After remaining a weak depression for several days, it rapidly organized on September 29 to attain tropical storm status. Flora continued to strengthen, reaching Category 3 hurricane status after moving through the Windward Islands and passing over Tobago, and it reached maximum sustained winds of 150 miles per hour (240 km/h) in the Caribbean.

The storm struck southwestern Haiti near peak intensity, turned to the west, and drifted over Cuba for four days before turning to the northeast. Flora passed over the Bahamas and accelerated northeastward, becoming an extratropical cyclone on October 12. Due to its slow movement across Cuba, Flora is the wettest known tropical cyclone for Cuba, Haiti, and the Dominican Republic. The significant casualties caused by Flora were the most for a tropical cyclone in the Atlantic Basin since the 1900 Galveston Hurricane.

== Meteorological history ==
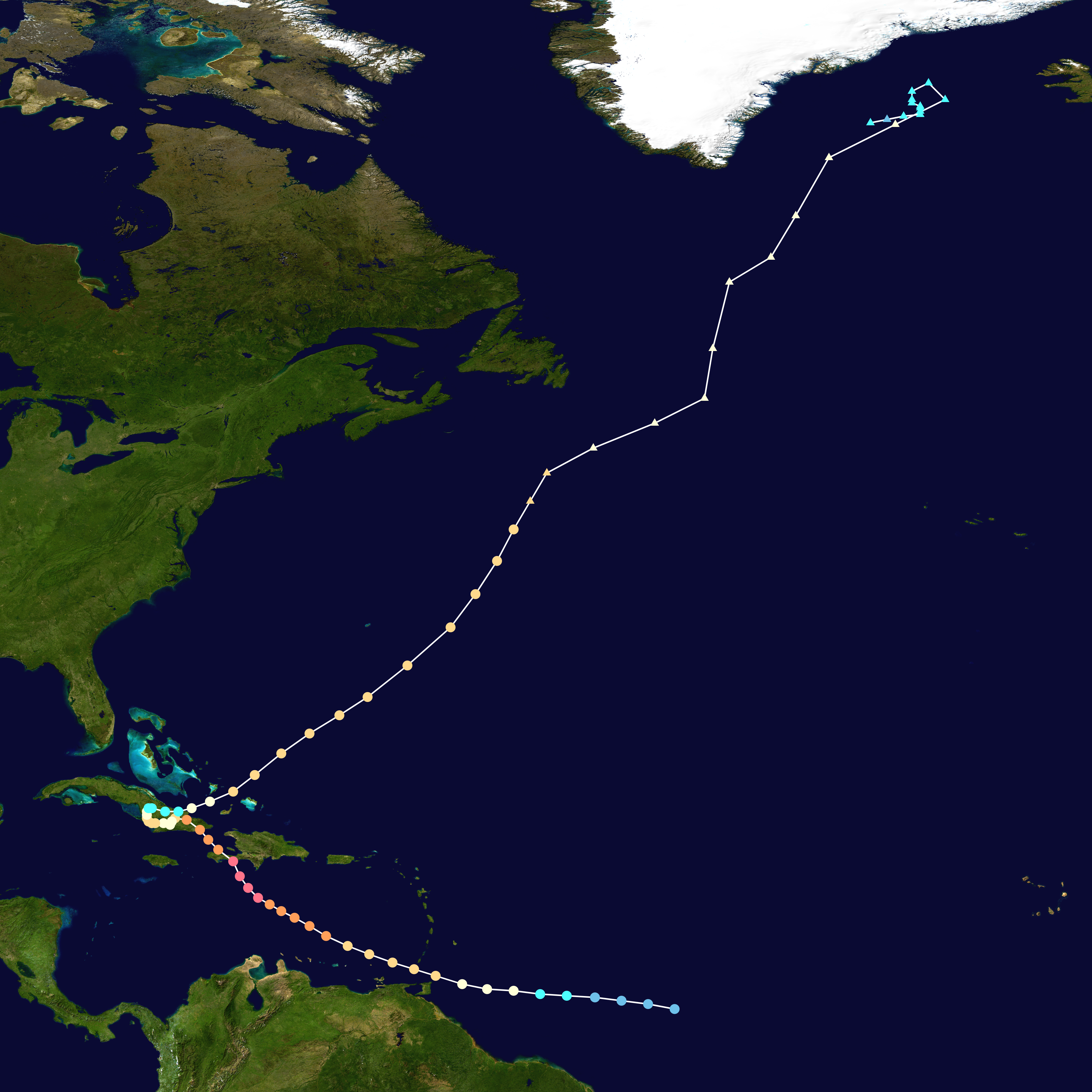
Map plotting the storm's track and intensity, according to the Saffir–Simpson scale Map key Saffir–Simpson scale Tropical depression (≤38 mph, ≤62 km/h) Tropical storm (39–73 mph, 63–118 km/h) Category 1 (74–95 mph, 119–153 km/h) Category 2 (96–110 mph, 154–177 km/h) Category 3 (111–129 mph, 178–208 km/h) Category 4 (130–156 mph, 209–251 km/h) Category 5 (≥157 mph, ≥252 km/h) Unknown Storm type Tropical cyclone Subtropical cyclone Extratropical cyclone, remnant low, tropical disturbance, or monsoon depression

The tropical wave that ultimately spawned Hurricane Flora moved off the coast of West Africa sometime late on September 23 or early September 24. (Note: For consistency, all dates and times are based on Coordinated Universal Time.) The disturbance gradually became better organized as it moved west across the tropical Atlantic. Imagery from the TIROS-7 satellite captured the developing system on September 26 in the vicinity of 11.5°N 35.0°W, revealing a large and complex cluster of clouds. Two disturbances comprising the complex were detected by the satellite, though it is unclear which particular disturbance became Flora. While the United States Weather Bureau contemporaneously assessed that Flora formed from the precursor disturbance on September 26, a reanalysis of the official Atlantic hurricane database by the Hurricane Research Division (HRD) determined that the Flora first became a tropical depression on September 28, 48 hours later than initially assessed, on account of the incipient disturbance's lack of organization in both the September 26 TIROS-7 imagery and a subsequent image taken on September 27. Weather observations were scant in the vicinity of Flora around the time it became a tropical depression, preventing a more accurate determination of Flora's genesis. However, a KLM jet airliner en route to Paramaribo, Suriname, encountered disturbed weather east of the Lesser Antilles on September 28, prompting the Weather Bureau office in San Juan, Puerto Rico, to request special weather observations from ships in the area the next day and schedule an aerial reconnaissance mission into the storm for September 30. Retrospective analyses of Flora indicate that it reached tropical storm intensity on September 29. Delayed ship reports documented gale-force winds and low pressures in the vicinity of Flora between September 29–30. Flora reached hurricane intensity east of the Lesser Antilles by 00:00 UTC on September 30.

Aircraft hurricane reconnaissance first intercepted the center of Flora around 120 mi (190 km) east of Trinidad at 14:07 UTC on September 30, finding a well-defined eye surrounded by an eyewall spanning 8 mi (13 km) across within the compact hurricane. The flight also assessed winds exceeding the hurricane-force threshold and a central air pressure of 994 mbar (hPa; 29.35 inHg). A summary of the 1963 Atlantic hurricane season authored by Weather Bureau staff and published in the Monthly Weather Review described the mission's observations as "[indicating] that hurricane Flora was the most concentrated and best organized tropical cyclone of the past two years." Hurricane Flora rapidly intensified as it traversed the Windward Islands throughout September 30. The center of the hurricane made landfall on Tobago at around 18:00 UTC that day. A minimum air pressure of 974 mbar (hPa; 28.76 inHg) was registered at Crown Point, Tobago, which when reconciled with Flora's size, location, and forward speed suggested maximum sustained winds of around 105 mph (165 km/h). The center of Flora passed roughly 30 mi (48 km) south of Grenada about three hours later as the hurricane entered the southeastern Caribbean Sea.

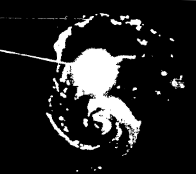
Radar image of Flora on October 2 as observed by U.S. Navy aircraft reconnaissance

Within the southeastern Caribbean Sea, Flora took a steady course towards Haiti's Tiburon Peninsula that curved progressively northwards with time. The hurricane's rate of intensification on October 1 had become more gradual, though the storm was continuing to strengthen. However, Flora began to strengthen quickly between October 2–3, with periodic aircraft reconnaissance missions finding increasing winds and deepening air pressures. Flight-level winds reaching 167 mph (269 km/h) were recorded by reconnaissance missions on both October 2 and October 3. The HRD reanalysis estimated that Flora became a major hurricane by around 06:00 UTC on October 2, (Note: A major hurricane is a storm that ranks as Category 3 or higher on the Saffir–Simpson hurricane wind scale.) with Flora's winds continuing to increase before reaching a peak of around 150 mph (240 km/h) by 18:00 UTC on October 4; this intensity is equivalent to a Category 4 hurricane on the modern Saffir–Simpson hurricane wind scale. Based on aircraft reconnaissance data, Flora had a minimum central air pressure of around 933 mbar (hPa; 27.55 inHg) and wind gusts of 180–200 mph (290–320 km/h) at the time of its peak strength. The hurricane had slowed its forward course and began moving more towards the north-northwest on October 3, leading to a landfall on southwestern Haiti near Côtes-de-Fer at 01:00 UTC on October 4. While the HRD reanalysis assessed that Flora made landfall at its peak intensity, the eight-hour gap between landfall and the preceding aircraft reconnaissance mission meant that Flora may have been considerably stronger than estimated at its Haitian landfall. Flora traversed the Tiburon Peninsula in roughly two hours before emerging into the Windward Passage. The hurricane subsequently made landfall on eastern Cuba approximately 30 mi (48 km) east of Guantanamo Bay at around 18:00 UTC on October 4 with maximum sustained winds estimated at 120 mph (195 km/h); this intensity is equivalent to a Category 3 hurricane on the Saffir–Simpson scale.

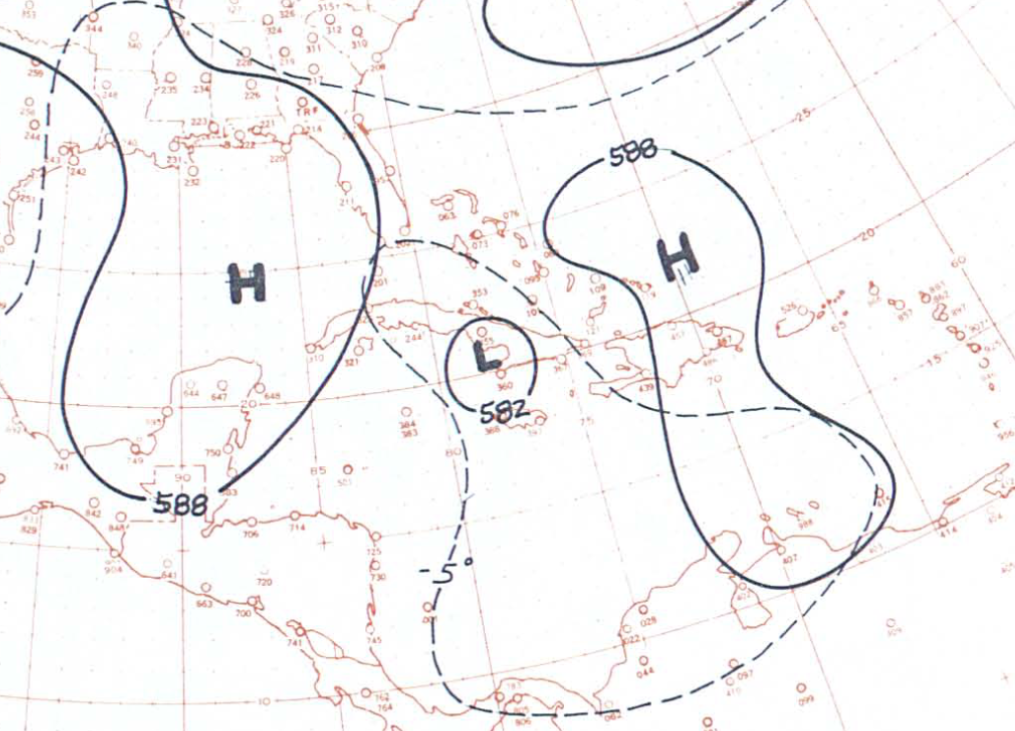
Weather map on October 6 showing ridges west and east of Flora

Changing atmospheric circulation patterns over the United States in early October 1963 were consequential in shaping Flora's trajectory leading up to and after the hurricane's landfalls on Haiti and Cuba. Although Flora's northward curve leading to its landfall on Haiti was spurred by the presence of a trough off the U.S. East Coast, (Note: The recurring presence of a trough off the U.S. East Coast turned hurricanes Arlene, Beulah, and Debra away from the contiguous U.S. earlier in the year.) the subsequent northward retreat of the trough and strengthening ridging over the eastern U.S. caused Flora to slowly curve west between October 5–7. Additional areas of high pressure to Flora's west and east prevented the hurricane from moving away from the region, resulting in Flora lingering near or over eastern Cuba for several days. While the hurricane's winds diminished somewhat due to Flora's persistent interaction with land, the storm maintained a strong intensity due in part to a conducive atmospheric environment and the presence of moist tropical air atop the warm waters surrounding Cuba. The hurricane also grew during its traversal of eastern Cuba, with its radius of outermost closed isobar expanding nearly three-fold. On October 6, Flora moved over the Gulf of Guacanayabo and likely restrengthened. At around 00:00 UTC on October 7, the center of Flora again moved ashore Cuba, this time a few miles west of Santa Cruz del Sur, with estimated maximum sustained winds of 100 mph (155 km/h). A strengthening anticyclone over the Gulf of Mexico stopped Flora's slow westward advance on October 7. Concurrently, the passage of two troughs off the U.S. East Coast and The Bahamas caused Flora to curve east and later northeast over the same regions of Cuba previously traversed by the hurricane. Between October 7–8, Flora's winds weakened to tropical storm intensity. However, Flora promptly intensified after reemerging into the Atlantic Ocean near Gibara along the northern Cuban coast after 12:00 UTC on October 8, regaining hurricane intensity six hours later.

Now moving more steadily towards the northeast, the center of Flora passed over Mayaguana at around 06:00 UTC on October 9 with sustained winds of around 100 mph (155 km/h). A minimum air pressure of 977 mbar (hPa; 28.85 inHg) was recorded on the island within Flora's eye. The hurricane continued to intensify after leaving the Bahamas, with sustained winds topping out at 110 mph (175 km/h). Accelerating northeast, Flora passed southeast of Bermuda on October 10 and began losing its tropical characteristics as it moved over the cooler waters of the mid-latitude Atlantic. The occurrence of frontogenesis by around 00:00 UTC on October 12 signaled the completion of Flora's transition into an extratropical cyclone. Although Flora weakened during this period, ships in the storm's vicinity observed hurricane-force winds. Remaining a strong extratropical cyclone, the remnants of Flora progressed northeast and meandered near the Denmark Strait between October 15–17, gradually weakening before being absorbed by a stronger extratropical cyclone.

== Preparations ==
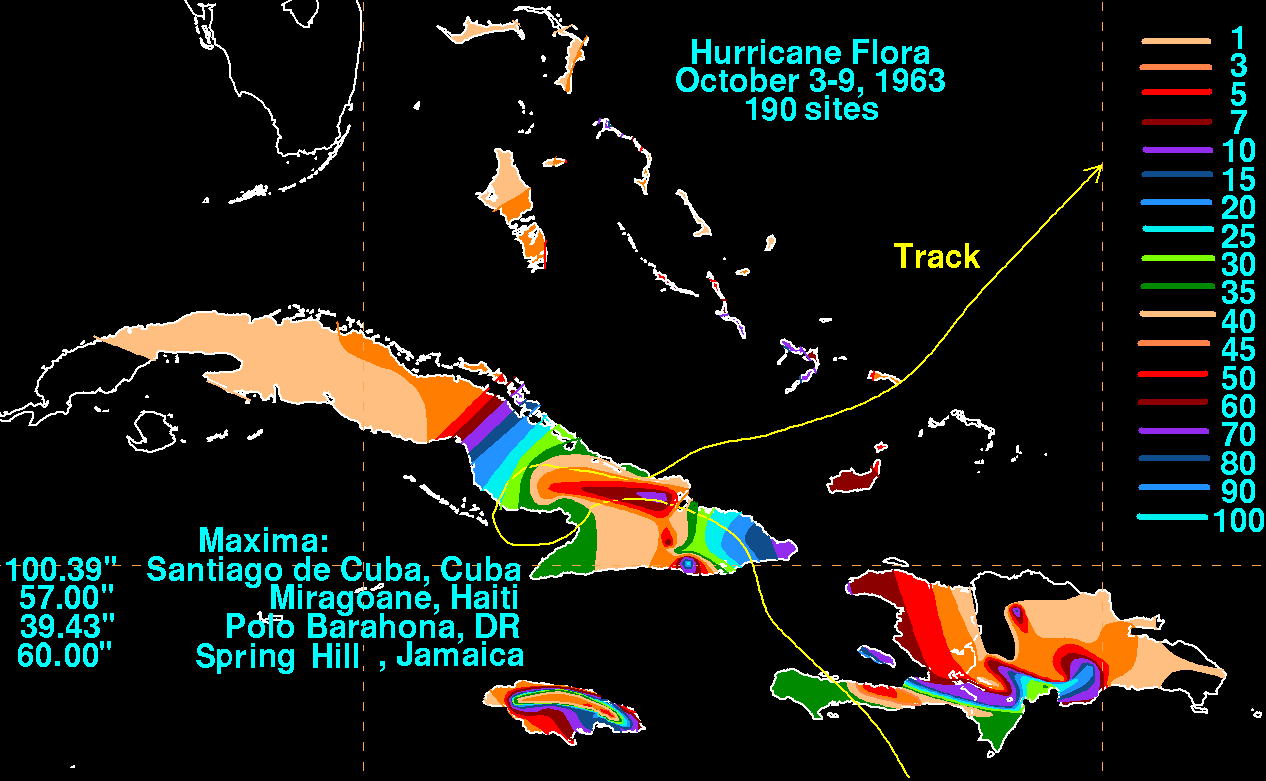
Hurricane Flora's storm total rainfall

The Weather Bureau in San Juan, Puerto Rico, issued a hurricane warning for Trinidad, Tobago, and the Grenadines south of Saint Vincent in the cyclone's first advisory on Hurricane Flora. Gale warnings were later issued for islands off northern Venezuela and from Saint Vincent northward to Martinique. Advisories on Flora emphasized the danger of the hurricane and advised preparations to be rushed to completion. The advisories also recommended small craft throughout the Windward Islands to remain at harbor and for shipping in the path of the hurricane to advise extreme caution. People in low-lying areas and near beaches were advised to evacuate to higher grounds, as well. Lead time was short, especially in Tobago which received news of the approaching hurricane just two hours before it struck.

On October 2, two days before it made landfall on southwestern Hispaniola, the San Juan Weather Bureau issued a gale warning from Barahona in the Dominican Republic to Sud-Est, Haiti. Advisories recommended small craft in the southern portions of the countries to remain at port. Later that day, the gale warning was upgraded to a hurricane warning in southwestern Haiti. On the day of when Flora made landfall, advisories recommended all citizens on beaches and in low-lying areas west of Santo Domingo to evacuate. Carmelo Di Franco, the provisional Director of Civic Defense for the Dominican Republic, organized safety procedures and the dissemination of tropical cyclone bulletins from the San Juan Weather Bureau. Di Franco also organized for the transmission of hurricane emergency information to citizens, believed to reduce the loss of life. On the afternoon before the hurricane struck, the head of the Haitian Red Cross prohibited radio broadcasts of tropical cyclone advisories for fear of panic among citizens. As a result, many thought the hurricane would miss the country.

In Cuba, the government enacted the Second Agrarian Reform Law the day before Hurricane Flora made landfall and had its attention focused on revolutionary politics rather than hurricane preparations. Officials at the Cuban National Observatory issued radio bulletins on the hurricane, which included the position of Flora, its intensity, direction of motion, and necessary warnings. By the time the hurricane left the island, more than 40,000 had been evacuated to safer areas.

The Weather Bureau predicted Flora to turn to the northwest after entering the Windward Passage and affect the Bahamas. Forecasters advised those in The Bahamas to quickly complete preparations, though the eye of the hurricane did not pass over the archipelago until four days later. When Flora turned to the northeast out to sea, forecasters again advised Bahamian citizens to prepare for the hurricane, and on October 9, weather advisories advised the southeastern Bahamas to prepare for gale-force winds and strong tides. One advisory considered there to be less than a 50% chance of the hurricane reaching southeastern Florida, though weather bulletins advised Florida citizens to monitor the hurricane. At its closest approach to Florida, the hurricane remained 330 miles (530 km) away, though gale warnings were issued from Stuart to Key West due to the hurricane's large size.

== Impact ==
Storm effects by region
Region	Deaths	Damage (1963 USD)
Trinidad and Tobago	24	$30 million
Grenada	6	$25,000
Dominican Republic	400+	$60 million
Haiti	5,000	$180 million
Cuba	1,750	$500 million
Jamaica	11	$11.9 million
Bahamas	1	$1.5 million
Florida	1	0
Total	7,193	$773.4 million

Throughout its path, Hurricane Flora resulted in more than 7,000 deaths and about $773.4 million in damage (1963 USD, 8.13 billion 2026 USD). It is estimated that, if a hurricane like Flora had struck in 1998, it would have caused over 12,000 casualties.

=== East Caribbean ===
Hurricane Flora passed Barbados a few days after Hurricane Edith moved through the area. The two hurricanes resulted in about $65,000 in damage (1963 USD), primarily to fishing interests.

About four hours before the eye of Hurricane Flora moved over Tobago, the large hurricane began producing heavy rainfall throughout the island. Two hours later, strong winds began affecting the island, and while moving across the island Flora produced winds of up to 100 miles per hour (160 km/h). While moving past Tobago, the hurricane produced rough surf and tides 5 to 7 feet (1.5 to 2.1 m) above normal. The hurricane sunk six ships between 4 and 9 tons in Scarborough harbour. One crew member drowned while attempting to save his vessel. Heavy rainfall caused a large mudslide from Mount Dillon onto a road leading to Castara. This was considered the most well-known mudslide on the island. The strong winds caused severe damage to coconut, banana, and cocoa plantations, with 50% of the coconut trees being destroyed and another 11% being severely damaged. 75% of forest trees fell, and most of the remaining were greatly damaged. The passage of Hurricane Flora destroyed 2,750 of Tobago's 7,500 houses, and damaged 3,500 others. The hurricane killed 18 on the island and resulted in $30 million in crop and property damage (1963 USD).

Winds on Trinidad reached 55 mph (89 km/h) with much higher gusts of over 70 mph (110 km/h). Heavy rainfall and strong winds in the northern mountainous region lowered the visibility to zero. Due to the mountain range on its northern coast, damage on the island was minimal, totaling to $100,000 (1963 USD). Two people on the island died due to drowning. When Flora passed the island and the winds turned to the southwest, many small boats in the westward facing harbor were sunk. Near Chaguaramas, nine boats were destroyed and eight were damaged. Additionally, several large vessels sustained damage and resulted in them being intentionally sunk. Damage in Grenada was minor, around $25,000 (1963 USD), though six people died due to drowning. Rough seas and higher than normal tides were reported along the south coast of Puerto Rico, though no damage or deaths were reported there.

=== Dominican Republic and Haiti ===
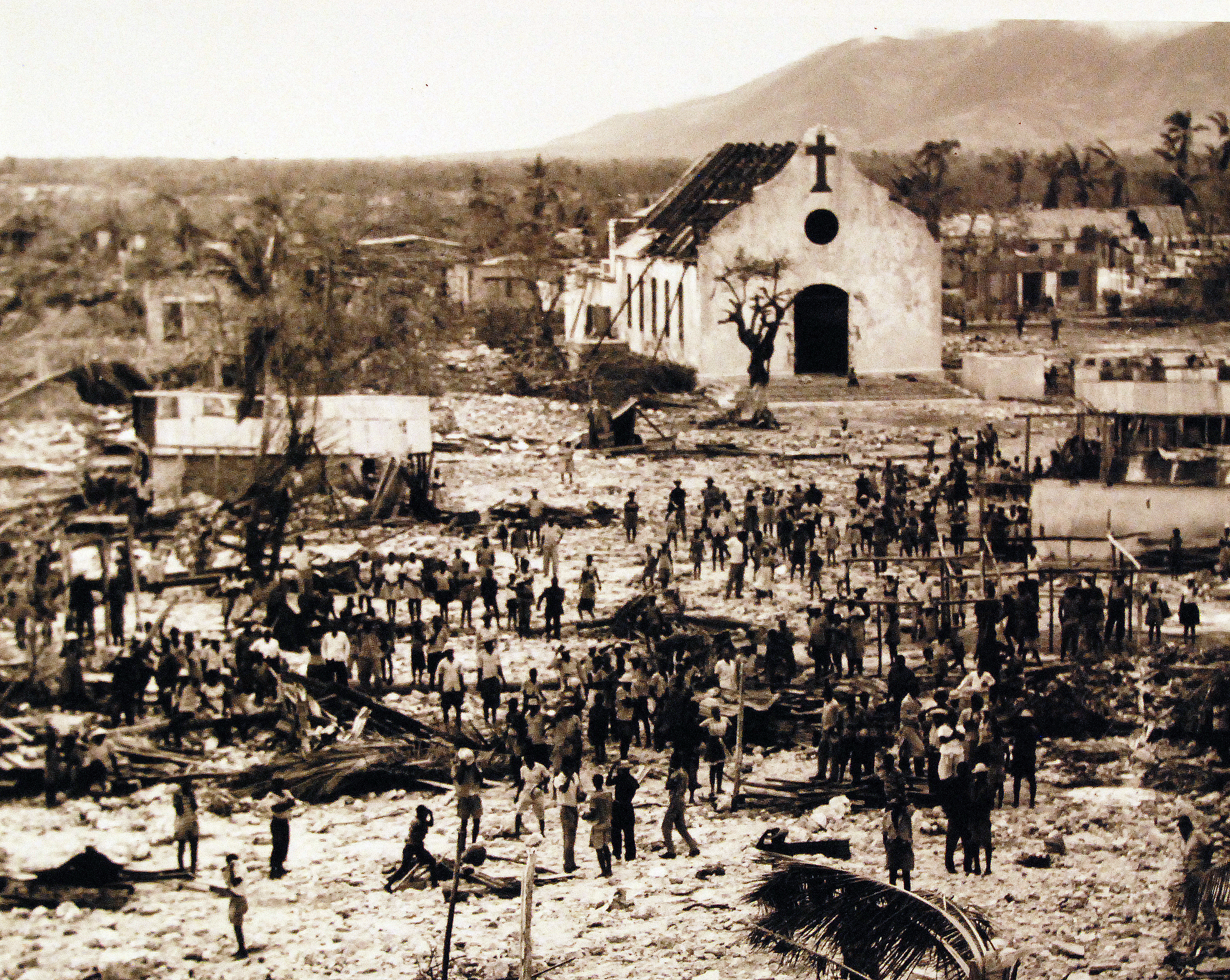
Petit-Trou-de-Nippes, one of the many Haitian villages left in ruins, was about 85% destroyed.

Flora produced heavy rainfall and moderately strong winds in the Dominican Republic. The highest rainfall amount reported was 39.43 inches (1,002 mm) at Polo Barahona. Flooding from the hurricane, considered to be the most extensive on record, greatly damaged bridges and roads, with many roads left unpassable for several months after the hurricane struck. Over 3,800 mi^{2} (9,800 km^{2}) in the western portion of the country were flooded. The hurricane caused about $60 million in damage (1963 USD) and over 400 deaths.

Wettest tropical cyclones and their remnants in Haiti Highest-known totals
Precipitation			Storm	Location	Ref.
Rank	mm	in	Storm	Location	Ref.
1	1,447.8	57.00	Flora 1963	Miragoâne	
2	934.0	36.77	Melissa 2025	Camp Perrin	
3	654.8	25.78	Noel 2007	Camp Perrin	
4	604.5	23.80	Matthew 2016	Anse-á-Veau	
5	410.0	16.14	Lili 2002	Camp Perrin	
6	323.0	12.72	Hanna 2008	Camp Perrin	
7	273.0	10.75	Gustav 2008	Camp Perrin	
8	168.0	6.614	Laura 2020	Port-Au-Prince	
9	65.0	2.56	Fox 1952	Ouanaminthe	

While moving across southwestern Haiti, Hurricane Flora produced winds of up to 120 mph (190 km/h) near Derez, while the capital city of Port-au-Prince reported peak winds of 65 mph (105 km/h). Intense rainbands dropped torrential precipitation estimated at over 75 inches (1,900 mm) in Miragoâne, with one location recording over 57 inches (1,400 mm) in three days. One location in the southwestern peninsula recorded 16 inches (410 mm) of precipitation in 12 hours. The storm surge on the southern coast is unknown, but estimated to exceed 12 feet (3.7 m). Flash floods from the hurricane washed out large sections of several towns, while mudslides buried some entire towns, resulting in many deaths. Heavy rainfall led to river flooding along the Grise River, which crested at 14 feet (4.3 m) above normal. The flood waters created new channels and washed away entire banana plantations.

Strong winds in southwestern Haiti from the hurricane damaged or destroyed hundreds of trees. The path of Flora over the area was best determined by the trajectory of fallen trees across the peninsula. The strong winds left entire villages roofless, with many buildings entirely destroyed. The combination of rough waves and strong winds destroyed three entire communities. Many of those who died in southwestern Haiti suffered from intense burns from strong winds. In most areas, crops were entirely destroyed. The coffee crop was harvested prior to the arrival of the hurricane, though heavy rainfall and severe flooding ruined the crop for later years. Additionally, strong winds downed shading trees for the coffee crop on the southern peninsula. One official estimated it would require three years for the coffee crop to be replanted and regrown.

About 3,500 people were confirmed dead, with several thousands missing at one report five months after the hurricane. It is estimated the passage of Hurricane Flora killed around 5,000 people and caused between $125 million and $180 million in damage in Haiti (1963 USD).

=== Cuba, Jamaica, the Bahamas, and Florida ===
Deadliest Atlantic hurricanes
Rank	Hurricane	Season	Fatalities
1	? "Great Hurricane"	1780	22,000–27,501
2	5 Mitch	1998	11,374+
3	2 Fifi	1974	8,210–10,000
4	4 "Galveston"	1900	8,000–12,000
5	4 Flora	1963	7,193
6	? "Pointe-à-Pitre"	1776	6,000+
7	5 "Okeechobee"	1928	4,112+
8	? "Newfoundland"	1775	4,000–4,163
9	3 "Monterrey"	1909	4,000
10	4 "San Ciriaco"	1899	3,855

Strong northerly winds from Flora eroded the northern beaches in the Cuban province of Camagüey by up to 3,300 feet (1 km). Santa Cruz del Sur reported strong southerly winds and rough seas. Winds in Cuba reached 125 mph (201 km/h). Due to its slow movement across Cuba, the storm dropped extreme rainfall amounts on the eastern side of the island. Isolated locations in Cuba received over 80 in (2,000 mm) of precipitation, with Santiago de Cuba recording 100.39 in (2,550 mm), which is the highest rainfall total measured on Cuba from any rainfall event on record. Strong winds and flooding caused significant damage to crops in the region. The storm destroyed about 25% of coffee, 10% of the corn, up to 15% of sugar crops throughout the country, while at least a majority of banana and orange crops were lost. Further, Flora destroyed an estimated 50% of winter rice crops in Camagüey and Oriente provinces – roughly 25% of production nationally. Approximately 50% of cotton was lost in Oriente Province, which produced about half of Cuba's cotton crop.

Many citizens were left stranded at the tops of their homes. Floodwaters damaged or destroyed tens of thousands of homes throughout Cuba. A tabulation complete through October 20 indicated that the storm damaged approximately 21,000 homes and destroyed more than 11,000 others in Oriente Province alone. Throughout the country, the hurricane destroyed as many as 30,000 dwellings. Many bridges, highways, and railroads, particularly in Oriente Province, became impassable due to flooding, landslides, and washouts. However, much of the damage was incurred to secondary highways and railways. Overall, Flora caused about $500 million in damage in Cuba and approximately 1,750 fatalities.

Heavy rainfall fell across the island of Jamaica due to southwest flow into the mountains on Flora's southern periphery over several days. The maximum amount recorded was 60 inches (1,500 mm) at Spring Hill persistent, which led to numerous landslides across the eastern portion of the island. Damage to the island totaled $11.9 million (1963 dollars). Rough seas from Flora affected the Bahamas and the southeastern Florida coast on October 5 as the hurricane stalled over Cuba, keeping small craft in port, and hurricane-force winds affected Ragged Island later that day. Rainfall amounts peaked at 17.19 inches (437 mm) at Duncan Town, in the Bahamas. Damage to the island archipelago reached $1.5 million (1963 dollars).

== Aftermath ==
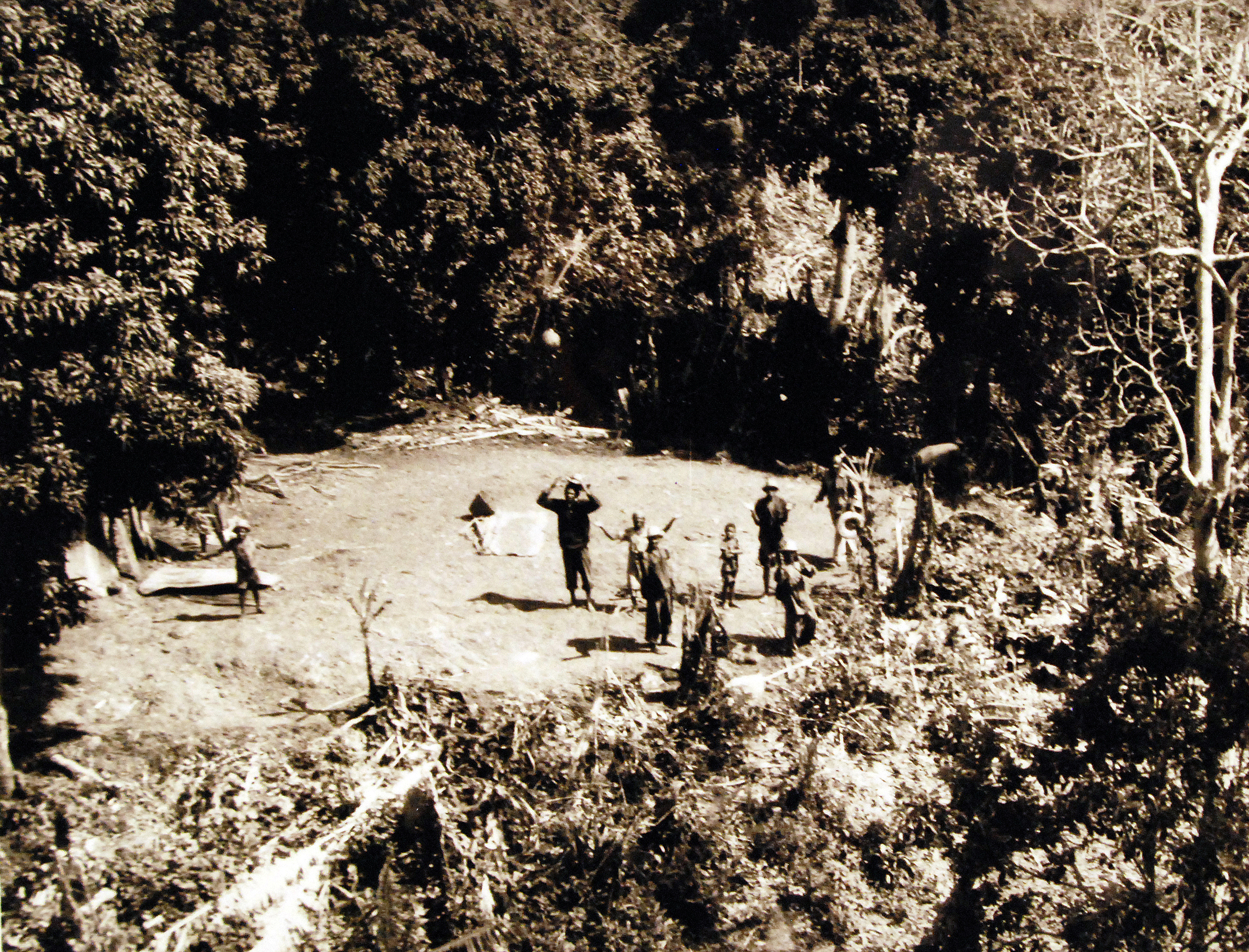
Haitians isolated by Flora awaiting rescue. USS Lake Champlain and USS Thetis Bay launched marine helicopters that evacuated 347 storm victims and distributed 330,105 lb of relief supplies.

In Tobago, the great agricultural damage from Flora caused the crop plantations to be abandoned. As a result, the economy of the island changed towards tourism. The destruction of the Tobagonian rainforests resulted in a continual decline of agriculture on the island due to animals previously in the forest eating the crops for food. The passage of the hurricane reduced the height of the rainforest canopy above 800 ft (240 m) by half. Twenty-five years passed before the canopy reached its previous height.

In the Dominican Republic, damage reports were largely unknown by a month after the hurricane passed the island, primarily in the western provinces. There, roads were still impassable, large areas remained without electricity, and helicopters could not land in remote areas due to mud, silt, and up to 3 ft (0.91 m) of water in all landing fields. One official estimated several months would pass before survey teams could obtain information on loss of life and overall damages.

Hurricane Flora had a lasting impact on Cuba's disaster risk reduction policies. The extensive damage and loss of life led the Cuban government to institutionalize disaster preparedness as a central part of state governance. The event catalyzed the development of Cuba's Civil Defense system, integrating community-based preparedness and centralized response mechanisms, which significantly reduced mortality in subsequent hurricanes. The government of Cuba implemented further restrictions on ongoing rations, including adding rations on sugar for the first time in the country's history. Amidst a political crisis between Cuba and the United States, the Cuban Red Cross refused aid from the American Red Cross, referring to the offer of aid as hypocritical "by a country [the United States] that is trying to destroy us [Cuba] with economic blockades and other measures." The Soviet Union delivered large quantities of food, medicine, and other supplies vital to recovery, while the other satellite states in Europe promised aid. China sent medicine and powdered milk totaling about $200,000 in value while also contributing the same amount in cash.

=== Retirement ===
Due to the severe damage and loss of life the hurricane caused across the Caribbean, the name Flora was retired from the rotating list of Atlantic tropical cyclone names by the Weather Bureau in the fall of 1963. It was replaced with Fern for the 1967 season.

== See also ==
- List of Atlantic hurricanes
- List of South America tropical cyclones
- List of wettest tropical cyclones
- List of wettest tropical cyclones in Cuba since 1963
- List of Cuba hurricanes
