= List of storms named Edith =

The name Edith has been used for seven tropical cyclones worldwide.

== Atlantic Ocean ==
- Hurricane Edith (1955) – remained over open waters.
- Tropical Storm Edith (1959) – moved through the Lesser Antilles before dissipating south of Hispaniola.
- Hurricane Edith (1963) – caused 10 deaths in Martinique and moderate damage along its path through the northeastern Caribbean.
- Tropical Storm Edith (1967)- moved through the Lesser Antilles before dissipating to the south of Puerto Rico.
- Hurricane Edith (1971) – struck Cape Gracias a Dios as a Category 4 hurricane where it caused 30 deaths; later made landfall on Louisiana and caused $25 million in damage (1971 USD) in the United States.

== Southwest Indian Ocean ==
- Cyclone Edith (1971) – struck Madagascar.

== Australian region ==
- Cyclone Edith (1967) – remained over open waters.
