= Hurricane Ginny =

Category 2 Atlantic hurricane in 1963

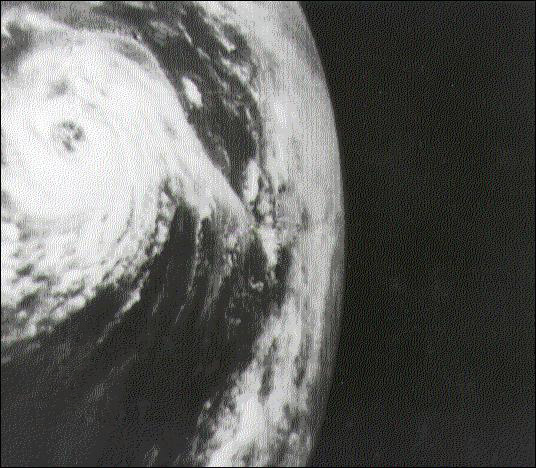
- Ginny TIROS satellite image

Meteorological history
- Formed: October 16, 1963
- Dissipated: October 29, 1963

Category 2 hurricane
- 1-minute sustained (SSHWS/NWS)
- Highest winds: 110 mph (175 km/h)
- Lowest pressure: 948 mbar (hPa); 27.99 inHg

Overall effects
- Fatalities: 3 related
- Damage: $500,000 (1963 USD)
- Areas affected: Hispaniola, Lucayan Archipelago, East Coast of the United States, Atlantic Canada
- IBTrACS
- Part of the 1963 Atlantic hurricane and 1963–64 North American winter seasons

Hurricane Ginny was a strong and erratic tropical cyclone that paralleled the East Coast of the United States before making landfall in Nova Scotia, in Maritime Canada, in October 1963. The eighth tropical storm, as well as the seventh and final hurricane of the 1963 Atlantic hurricane season, Ginny developed on October 16 over the Bahamas, although it was not initially a fully tropical cyclone. As it moved to the North and later northwest, Ginny intensified to hurricane status as it became more tropical. For eight days, it was located within 250 mi (400 km) of the United States coastline. After approaching North Carolina, Ginny looped to the southwest and approached within 50 mi (80 km) of the Florida coastline. It turned to the North, to the East, and later to the northeast, strengthening late in its duration to peak Category 2 winds of 110 mph (175 km/h). The system made landfall in Nova Scotia at near-peak intensity on October 29, then became an extratropical cyclone shortly afterwards. It was the strongest tropical cyclone on record to make landfall in Canada while maintaining tropical characteristics.

Although it remained close to the United States coastline, its impact was minor. Beach erosion and light rainfall was reported along much of the coastline, although the precipitation was beneficial in ending droughts in South Carolina and New England. High waves destroyed one house in North Carolina. Damage was heaviest in New England, where several buildings were damaged and thousands were left without power. The passage of Ginny resulted in a snow storm across eastern New England, particularly in northern Maine, where it killed two people. In Atlantic Canada, the extratropical storm produced high wind and waves, causing damage to boats and resulting in power outages.

== Meteorological history ==
Map plotting the storm's track and intensity, according to the Saffir–Simpson scale Map key Saffir–Simpson scale Tropical depression (≤38 mph, ≤62 km/h) Tropical storm (39–73 mph, 63–118 km/h) Category 1 (74–95 mph, 119–153 km/h) Category 2 (96–110 mph, 154–177 km/h) Category 3 (111–129 mph, 178–208 km/h) Category 4 (130–156 mph, 209–251 km/h) Category 5 (≥157 mph, ≥252 km/h) Unknown Storm type Tropical cyclone Subtropical cyclone Extratropical cyclone, remnant low, tropical disturbance, or monsoon depression

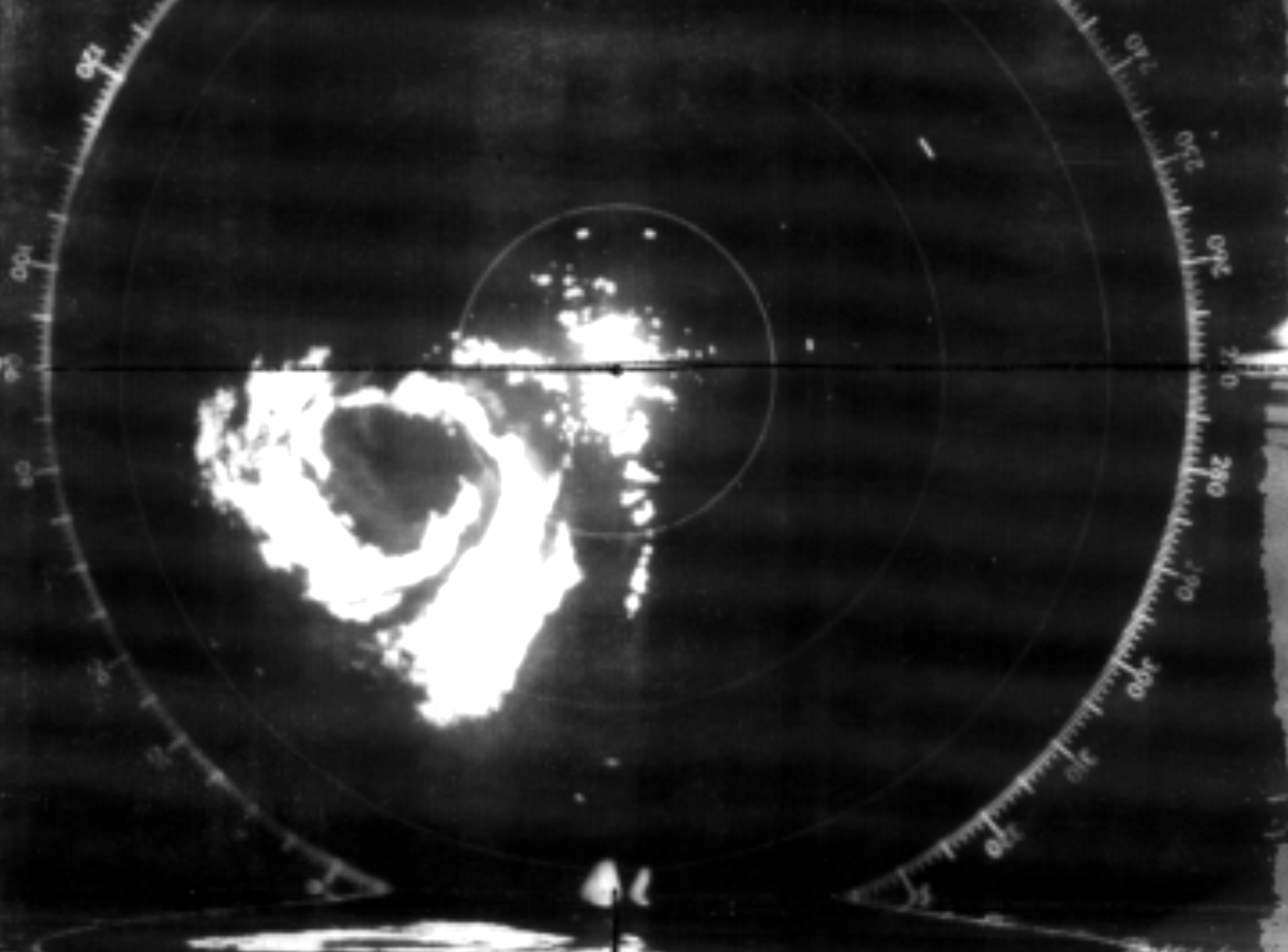
Hurricane Ginny as seen on radar on October 24, 1963 off the coast of Florida.

The origins of Hurricane Ginny were from a trough that extended from the Bahamas to Bermuda in the middle of October. On October 16, a depression formed near the Turks and Caicos islands after a tropical wave interacted with the trough, although initially it was not tropical in nature due to the widespread presence of cold air. The system initially moved generally northward, attaining gale–force winds on October 19 as it turned to the northwest. For several days, Ginny maintained a hybrid-type structure, and although it attained winds of 75 mph (121 km/h) on October 20, it was not a true hurricane. It closely approached the North Carolina coastline, passing 135 mi (220 km) southeast of Cape Lookout before turning abruptly to the northeast. It executed a small loop and began a steady motion to the southeast while located over the Gulf Stream. This motion was due to a large ridge located over New England. On October 21, the hurricane became better organized and began transitioning into a tropical cyclone. By early on October 22, Hurricane Hunters indicated that Ginny completed the transition into a fully tropical cyclone, observing an eye 20 mi (32 km) in diameter.

On October 23, Ginny briefly weakened to tropical storm status as it was moving toward Florida, although within 10 hours it regained hurricane intensity. Its motion to the southwest was unusual but not unique, and resembled the tracks of the 1935 Yankee hurricane and Hurricane Able in 1951. On October 24, it turned sharply northeastward off the northeast Florida coast, coming within 50 mi (80 km) of Daytona Beach. The hurricane continued paralleling the coast of the Southeastern United States, turning northeast away from Georgia and South Carolina. On October 26, Ginny turned to the east away from the United States, having been located within 250 mi (400 km) of the country's coast for eight consecutive days. The next day, the hurricane began a motion to the northeast, accelerating in advance of an approaching trough. It gradually intensified, reaching peak winds of 110 mph (175 km/h) on October 29. Later that day, Ginny made landfall near Yarmouth, Nova Scotia while only weakening slightly with sustained winds of 105 mph (165 km/h), making it the strongest tropical cyclone known to have made landfall in Canada. Ginny became extratropical shortly thereafter, and its remnants dissipated on October 30 in the Gulf of Saint Lawrence.

== Impact ==
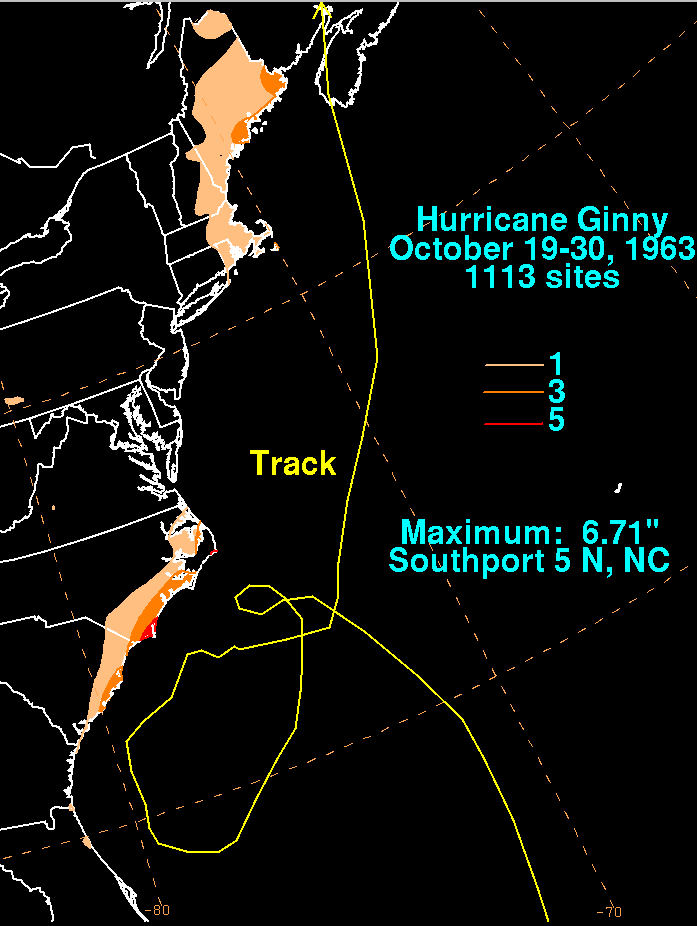
Ginny's precipitation across the United States

Early in its duration, the precursor to Ginny dropped high amounts of rainfall. Monción in the Dominican Republic reported 6.83 in (173 mm), and Green Turtle Cay in the Bahamas reported 4.20 in (107 mm).

Despite Ginny's proximity to the United States for over a week, a hurricane warning was only issued from Charleston, South Carolina, and Cape Fear, North Carolina, as well as Cape Hatteras. This represented about one-sixth of the entire coastline that was threatened by the storm. In Jacksonville, Florida, Ginny produced winds of 40 mph (64 km/h). Rainfall in the state peaked at 1.32 in (34 mm) at Saint Augustine. Tides in Daytona Beach were 3 ft (0.91 m) above normal, which caused beach erosion and minor property damage. Further north, minor damage and beach erosion was likewise reported in Georgia. Along the South Carolina coast, Ginny dropped beneficial rainfall, which alleviated the state's worst drought conditions on record. The rainfall peaked at 5.06 in (129 mm) in Isle of Pines.

The hurricane approached North Carolina twice. During the second time, residents in low-lying areas and along the coast evacuated. As it passed the area, Ginny produced sustained winds that were estimated at 70 mph (110 km/h) on Cape Fear, with gusts to 100 mph (160 km/h). These were the highest winds related to the hurricane, although they may have been overestimated. In addition, the heaviest rainfall related to the storm occurred near Southport, where 6.71 in (170 mm) of precipitation fell. Tides along the coast were 4 ft (1.2 m) above normal, which caused minor flooding and destroyed one house in Carolina Beach. In Virginia, the hurricane caused minor flooding and minimal beach erosion. During Ginny's first approach through the region, it produced gale-force winds along the Virginia coast, although it did not do so during its second approach.

Later, a gale warning was issued for New England due to Ginny's threat, as well as a hurricane watch for Long Island and southern New England. Across the region, the strongest winds on land were 65 mph (105 km/h) along Nantucket, where a gust of 76 mph (122 km/h) was also reported. However, a boat offshore Portland, Maine reported 40 ft (12 m) seas and winds of at least 105 mph (169 km/h). In New York City, the outskirts of the storm dropped 0.10 in (2.5 mm) of precipitation, and tides were 1 ft (0.30 m) above normal. Rainfall in eastern New England surpassed 1 in (25 mm), peaking at 3.92 in (100 mm) in Machias, Maine. The rainfall was beneficial across the region, ending a 28-day drought. Along Cape Cod and in Maine, high winds from the storm downed several trees, some of which fell onto power lines. About 1,000 homes in Chatham, Massachusetts lost power. In Nantucket, high waves caused additional erosion in an area affected by Hurricane Esther two years prior. Damage was heavier in Maine, where many boats were damaged or broke from their moorings. One person died from a heart attack while trying to rescue his boat. Several small buildings in the state were destroyed, and the post office in Calais, Maine lost its roof. Ginny was the latest hurricane on record to affect Maine. During its passage, Ginny brought an influx of cold air over New England that produced the first snowfall of the season across Massachusetts, Maine, and New Hampshire. In most locations, the snow quickly melted, although higher totals occurred in northern Maine, the highest being 4 ft (1.2 m) on Mount Katahdin. The snow killed a mountain climber and a park ranger. Damage from Ginny in the United States was estimated at $400,000.

As the remnants of Ginny moved across Atlantic Canada, they produced heavy rainfall, peaking at 4.53 in (113 mm) in southern New Brunswick. Winds peaked at 99 mph (160 km/h) in Greenwood, Nova Scotia. The winds blew down trees in the Halifax area, and there were power outages reported there and in Antigonish. High waves broke boats from their moorings, causing them to either wash ashore or float out to sea. Ferry service across the region was canceled. In neighboring New Brunswick, the storm caused outages to telephone and electric services. Several injuries were reported, although there were no fatalities. The entirety of Prince Edward Island was also left without power.

== See also ==
- List of New England hurricanes
- List of hurricanes in Canada
