= Hurricane Edith (1963) =

Category 2 Atlantic hurricane in 1963

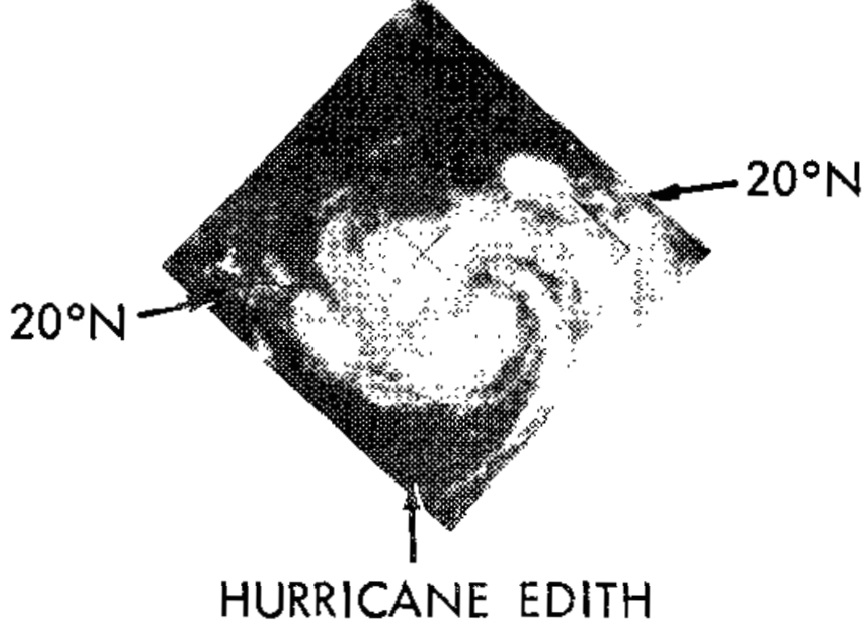
- An infrared satellite image of Hurricane Edith

Meteorological history
- Formed: September 23, 1963
- Dissipated: September 29, 1963

Category 2 hurricane
- 1-minute sustained (SSHWS/NWS)
- Highest winds: 100 mph (155 km/h)
- Lowest pressure: 990 mbar (hPa); 29.23 inHg

Overall effects
- Fatalities: 10
- Damage: $46.6 million (1963 USD)
- Areas affected: Lesser Antilles, Trinidad and Tobago, Puerto Rico, Hispaniola, Lucayan Archipelago
- IBTrACS
- Part of the 1963 Atlantic hurricane season

Hurricane Edith was a moderately strong tropical cyclone that brought flooding and wind damage to portions of the Greater and Lesser Antilles. The sixth tropical storm and fifth hurricane of the 1963 season, Edith developed east of the Windward Islands on September 23 from an Intertropical Convergence Zone (ITCZ) disturbance. Initially a tropical depression, it strengthened into Tropical Storm Edith the next day. Shortly thereafter, Edith reached hurricane status. Edith fluctuated between Category 1 and 2 status as it moved west-northwest. Upon reaching Category 2 intensity on September 25, the storm peaked with winds of 100 mph (155 km/h). After striking Saint Lucia on September 25, the storm traversed the eastern Caribbean Sea. Curving north-northwest on September 26, Edith made landfall near La Romana, Dominican Republic, early on the following day as a minimal hurricane. Interaction with land and an upper-level trough caused Edith to weaken to a tropical storm on September 28 and to a tropical depression by the next day. The storm dissipated just east of the Bahamas on September 29.

In Martinique, a wind gust of 127 mph (204 km/h) was observed at Le Lamentin Airport; tides about 8 ft (2.4 m) above normal and heavy rainfall impacted the island. Throughout the island, about 6,000 homes were demolished and 13,000 others were severely impacted. Agriculture suffered significantly, with bananas and other food crops destroyed, while sugar cane experienced significant damage. Winds up to 80 mph (130 km/h) caused significant damage on Dominica and strong winds on Saint Lucia ruined about half of the island's banana crop. In Puerto Rico, the storm brought heavy rainfall to the southwest corner of the island and abnormally high tides to the south coast. Several beach front properties were badly damaged, particularly in the Salinas municipality. Overall, Edith caused 10 deaths, all on Martinique, and approximately $46.6 million (1963 USD) in damage. (Note: All damage figures are in 1963 United States dollars, unless otherwise noted)

== Meteorological history ==
Map plotting the storm's track and intensity, according to the Saffir–Simpson scale Map key Saffir–Simpson scale Tropical depression (≤38 mph, ≤62 km/h) Tropical storm (39–73 mph, 63–118 km/h) Category 1 (74–95 mph, 119–153 km/h) Category 2 (96–110 mph, 154–177 km/h) Category 3 (111–129 mph, 178–208 km/h) Category 4 (130–156 mph, 209–251 km/h) Category 5 (≥157 mph, ≥252 km/h) Unknown Storm type Tropical cyclone Subtropical cyclone Extratropical cyclone, remnant low, tropical disturbance, or monsoon depression

An area of disturbed weather in the Intertropical Convergence Zone was first observed on September 22 by the Dutch tanker Aceteon. On the following day, imagery from TIROS VII indicated that a surface circulation developed. With a reconnaissance aircraft observing winds of 29 mph (47 km/h), a tropical depression developed at 12:00 UTC on September 23 about 525 mi (845 km) east-southeast of Barbados. Later that day, the U.S. Weather Bureau initiated advisories on the system. Another flight on September 24 indicated that the depression strengthened into Tropical Storm Edith by 12:00 UTC. Six hours later, the system intensified into a Category 1 hurricane on the modern day Saffir–Simpson hurricane wind scale. Around 00:00 UTC on September 25, Edith strengthened into a Category 2 hurricane while situated north of Barbados. However, after six hours, the storm weakened to a Category 1 hurricane. Shortly after 06:00 UTC on September 25, Edith struck Saint Lucia with winds of 85 mph (140 km/h). Subsequently, entering the Caribbean Sea, the cyclone re-intensified into a Category 2 hurricane and soon peaked with maximum sustained winds of 100 mph (160 km/h) and a minimum barometric pressure of 990 mbar (29 inHg).

However, the storm began weakening again and fell to a Category 1 hurricane early on September 26. Around midday, Edith turned north-northwestward toward the Mona Passage. It made landfall slightly west of La Romana, Dominican Republic, around 08:00 UTC on September 27 with winds of 75 mph (120 km/h). Edith crossed the island in about eight hours and maintained hurricane status. However, the cyclone weakened over the Atlantic and eastern Bahamas due to further land interaction and a frontal low pressure area, which developed near South Florida a few days earlier and moved east-northeastward to a location about 690 mi (1,110 km) from Edith. As a result, the pressure gradient in the Bahamas region weakened significantly, disrupting the easterly flow north of Edith. At 00:00 UTC on September 28, the hurricane weakened to a tropical storm. Edith struck North Caicos in the Turks and Caicos Islands about 18 hours later with winds of 40 mph (65 km/h). Edith curved northeastward and weakened to a tropical depression early on September 29, shortly before dissipating about 70 mi (110 km) northeast of Mayaguana island in the Bahamas. The remnants of Edith were lasted noted moving in tandem with the frontal low well east of Bermuda.

== Preparations ==
At 18:00 UTC on September 24, when Edith intensified into a hurricane, hurricane warnings were issued from Guadeloupe to Saint Vincent, including Barbados. Gale warnings were also issued for areas north of Guadeloupe to Sint Maarten. As Edith approached Saint Lucia around 08:00 UTC on September 25, a hurricane watch was issued for Puerto Rico and the Virgin Islands. The warnings and advice given by the San Juan Weather Bureau were credited for limiting damage and loss of life on Martinique. After Edith entered the Caribbean later on September 25, the watch was spread to Haiti and the Dominican Republic, while gale warnings were issued for the south coast of Hispaniola, east of Santo Domingo, as well as Puerto Rico the Virgin Islands. At 08:00 UTC on September 26, hurricane warnings were issued for southern Haiti and southwestern Dominican Republic due to the impending threat. After Edith slowed and began a more northerly movement, a hurricane warning was issued for the eastern portion of the Dominican Republic and western Puerto Rico while the warning for western Hispaniola was discontinued at 02:00 UTC on September 27. Two hours later, the storm had weakened and it was evident that Edith would pass over the Dominican Republic. As a result, the hurricane warning for Puerto Rico was downgraded to a gale warning.

Along the south coast of Puerto Rico, particularly from Cabo Rojo to Humacao, residents were told to evacuate. Police and the Civil Defense assisted with evacuations. Additionally, residents of low-lying areas in Dominican Republic and Haiti were advised to seek higher ground.

== Impact ==
Hurricane Edith was responsible for approximately $46.6 million in damage. Edith passed just north of Barbados and delivered between 7–9 inches (180–230 mm) of rain to the island. Wind speeds were between 60 and 65 mph (97 and 105 km/h) in the northern section of the island. Damage on the island totaled $145,000. In Martinique, the meteorological station at Le Lamentin Airport experienced wind gusts up to 127 mph (200 km/h). Wind and flood damage was reported, along with abnormally high waves. Throughout the island, about 6,000 homes were demolished and 13,000 other were severely impacted. Agriculture suffered significantly, with bananas and other food crops destroyed, while sugar cane experienced significant damage. Edith left 10 fatalities and 50 people seriously injured. Damage was estimated to be $40 million. Saint Lucia experienced wind gusts up to 90 mph (100 km/h), damaging about half of the banana crop. These winds were accompanied by heavy, flooding rains and the island received wind and flood damage as the hurricane made landfall. The damage on the island totaled just under $3.5 million.

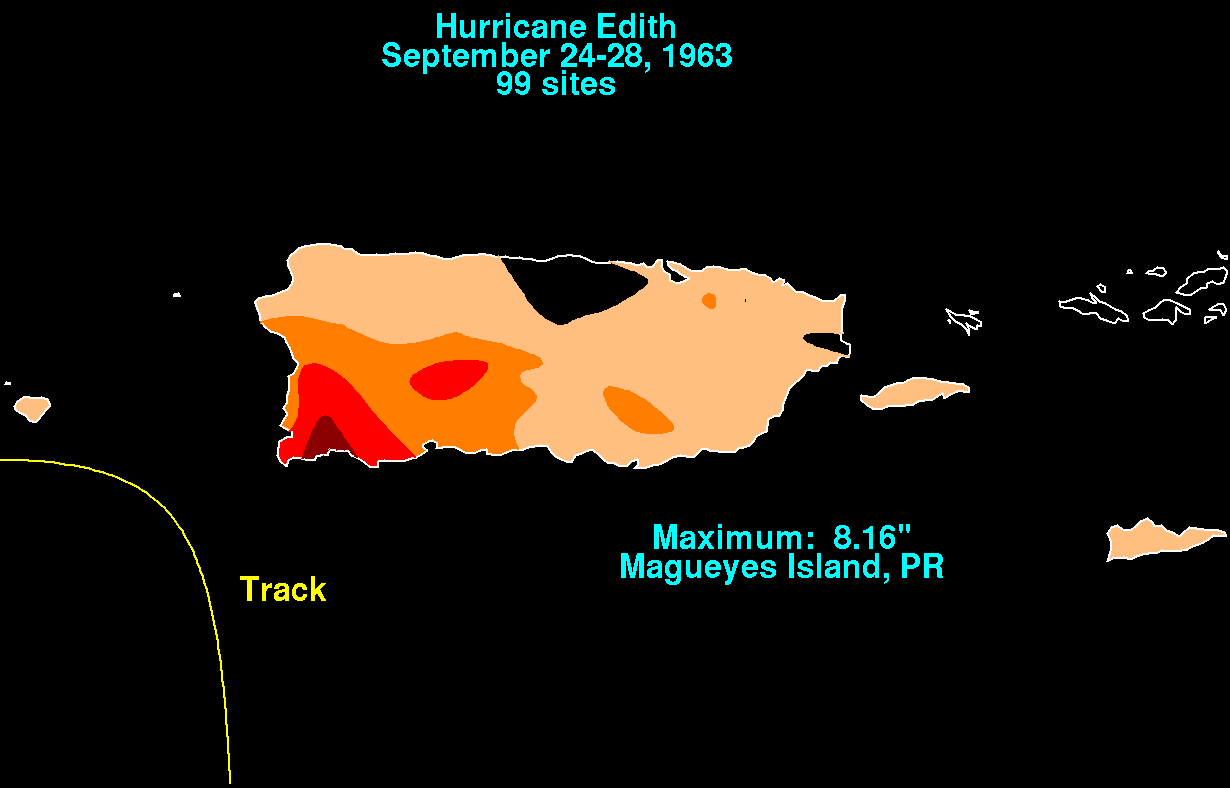
Rainfall amounts in Puerto Rico from Edith

Throughout southwestern Puerto Rico, the storm brought moderate rains, strong winds, and rough seas. Over 9 in (230 mm) of precipitation fell in the Lajas Valley during the passage of Hurricane Edith, while an official peak rainfall total of 8.16 in (207 mm) was observed on Isla Magueyes. Several southern and western locations in Puerto Rico observed tropical storm force winds, with the highest sustained wind speed of 60 mph (97 km/h) recorded in Cabo Rojo. Along the coast, rough seas were reported, with waves as high as waves high as 15 ft (4.6 m) lashing Ensenada, located in the municipality of Guánica.

In Ponce, waves flooded low-lying areas of the Playa de Ponce barrio. Winds deroofed six homes and severely damaged three others. Additionally, electrical and telephone lines were downed. Just offshore, Gatas, the island containing the Club Náutico de Ponce, was completely inundated. Damages to the yacht club totaled $100,000 and damages to the boats totaled $15,000. Flooding in the area resulted in about $25,000 in damage. At the Agricultural Experiment Station in Lajas, crops were heavily damaged by high winds. Near Salinas, about 200 ft (61 m) of Highway 1 was destroyed by high surf. Several beach front properties were badly damaged. Cabo Rojo bore the brunt of the storm with the center passing within 50 mi (80 km), resulting major flooding and extensive wind damage. In Maricao, winds and strong thunderstorms caused a few trees to be blown down. In Mayagüez, low-lying areas adjacent to the Yagüez River flooded after the river rose between 1 and 2 ft (0.30 and 0.61 m) above its average crest, causing about 300 people to flee their homes. Two homes were demolished and another was extensively damaged. Along the coast, waves inundated waterfront streets, leaving them barely passable. Approximately 4,000 acres (1,600 ha) of sugar cane fields were flooded in and around Añasco, Cabo Rojos, Hormigueros, and Lajas. Additionally, harvest equipment and a large amount of fertilizer were destroyed. Throughout Puerto Rico, agricultural damage alone was estimated to be over $150,000.

Impact in the Dominican Republic was minor, though winds between 50 and 60 mph (80 and 97 km/h) and heavy rain were recorded. At Turks and Caicos Islands, sustained winds of 37 mph (60 km/h) were observed, with gusts up to 51 mph (82 km/h).

== See also ==
- Other storms of the same name
- List of Category 2 Atlantic hurricanes
