= Port Acres, Port Arthur, Texas =

Area of Port Arthur, Texas, United States

Port Acres is an area of Port Arthur, Texas, United States that used to be a distinct unincorporated community in eastern Jefferson County. The community is between Texas State Highway 73 and Farm to Market Road 365 and west of Downtown Port Arthur.

In 1923 Tyrrell-Combest Company of Beaumont platted the community on land owned by J. M. Hebert. The community was located near the El Vista Railroad stop. Port Acres had around 1,500 residents in 1949. Residents voted to incorporate as a distinct municipality on a 578–180 margin in 1959; Port Arthur annexed the community instead.

The Port Arthur Convention and Visitors Bureau stated that Port Acres is "often regarded as" a "self-contained" community.

== Government and infrastructure ==
The United States Postal Service Port Acres Post Office is located at 5897 West Port Arthur Road. (The post office is closed, and there are no plans to reopen it.)

== Education ==
Port Acres is within the Port Arthur Independent School District. Port Acres Elementary School (formerly Richard W. Dowling Elementary School), in Port Acres, and Austin Middle School serve the area. All district residents are zoned to Memorial High School.

In March 1953, Dowling Elementary School was built and dedicated. It was renamed to Port Acres Elementary School in October 2018.
