= List of Jamaica hurricanes =

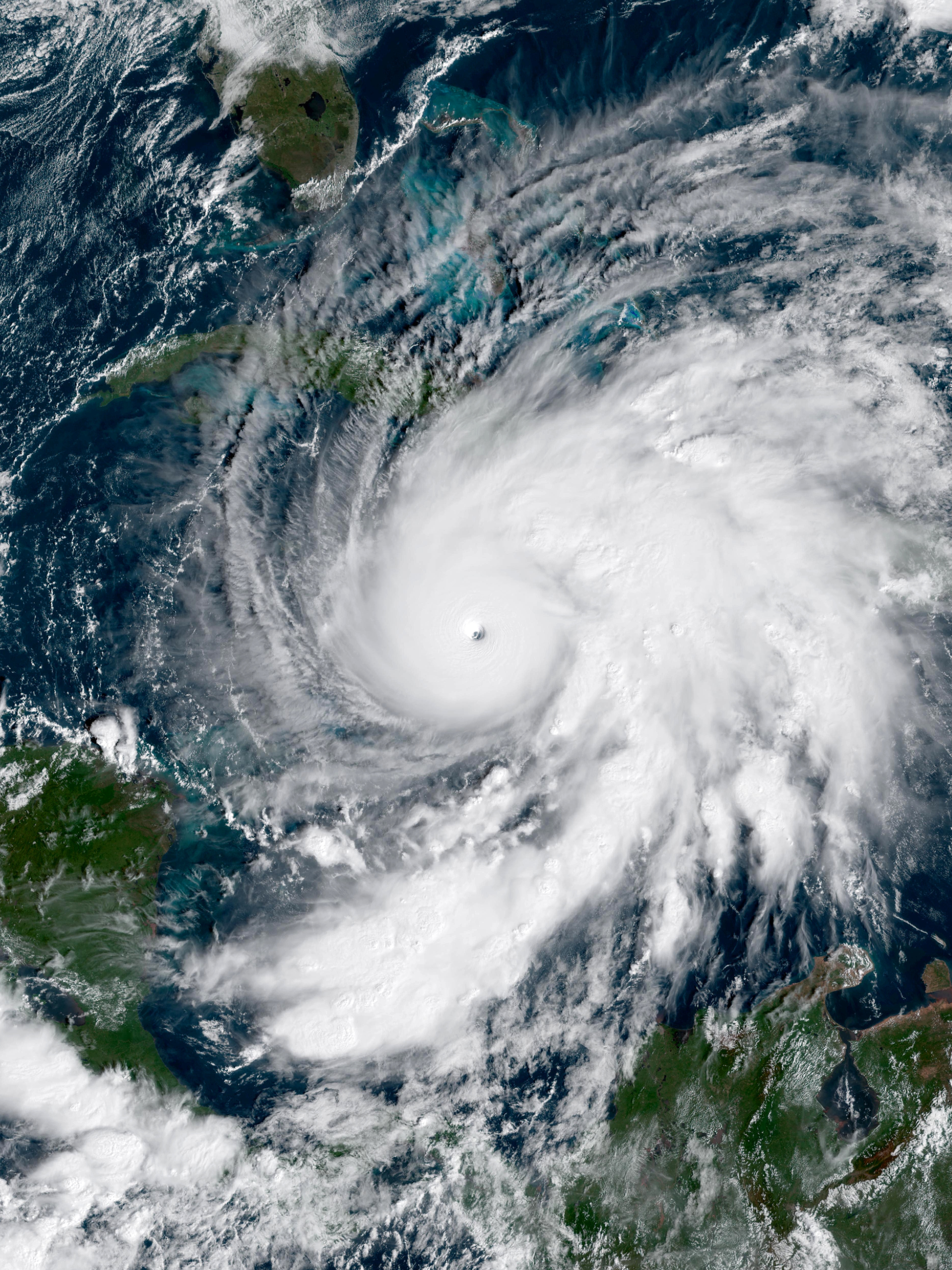
Hurricane Melissa was the strongest landfalling storm in Jamaican history.

The island nation of Jamaica lies in the Caribbean Sea, south of Cuba and west of Hispaniola. It frequently experiences the effects of Atlantic tropical cyclones that track across the Caribbean, with impacting storms often originating east of the Windward Islands or in the southern Caribbean between Nicaragua and Colombia. There are two climatologically favored periods during the year for Jamaica hurricane activity, with the first lasting from August to mid-September and the second occurring during the latter half of October.

== Observation ==
The earliest records of Jamaican hurricanes were derived from British observations during the colonial era, including those curated by British meteorologist William Reid and historians Bryan Edwards and Edward Long. In 2003, weather historical Michael Chenoweth developed a reconstruction of Jamaica's climate in the 18th century based on daily records kept by slaveowner Thomas Thistlewood, finding 12 tropical cyclone that produced gale-force or stronger sustained winds between 1750 and 1786 in Savanna-la-Mar. Thistlewood's observations were one of the first continuous weather records outside of Europe and the United States. Wind directions were also documented, with westerlies indicative of nearby tropical disturbances during the summer rainy season. Formal monitoring of hurricanes in Jamaica began with the formation of the Jamaican Weather Service in Kingston in 1880. The British Royal Navy, which maintained its largest Western Hemisphere base in Jamaica, was the world's foremost meteorological service for the previous two centuries. Between its formation and 1896, the agency observed 38 tropical depressions and issued hurricane warnings three times. Tropical cyclones were of great importance to colonial interests due to their effects on crops and the slave trade.

== Climatology ==
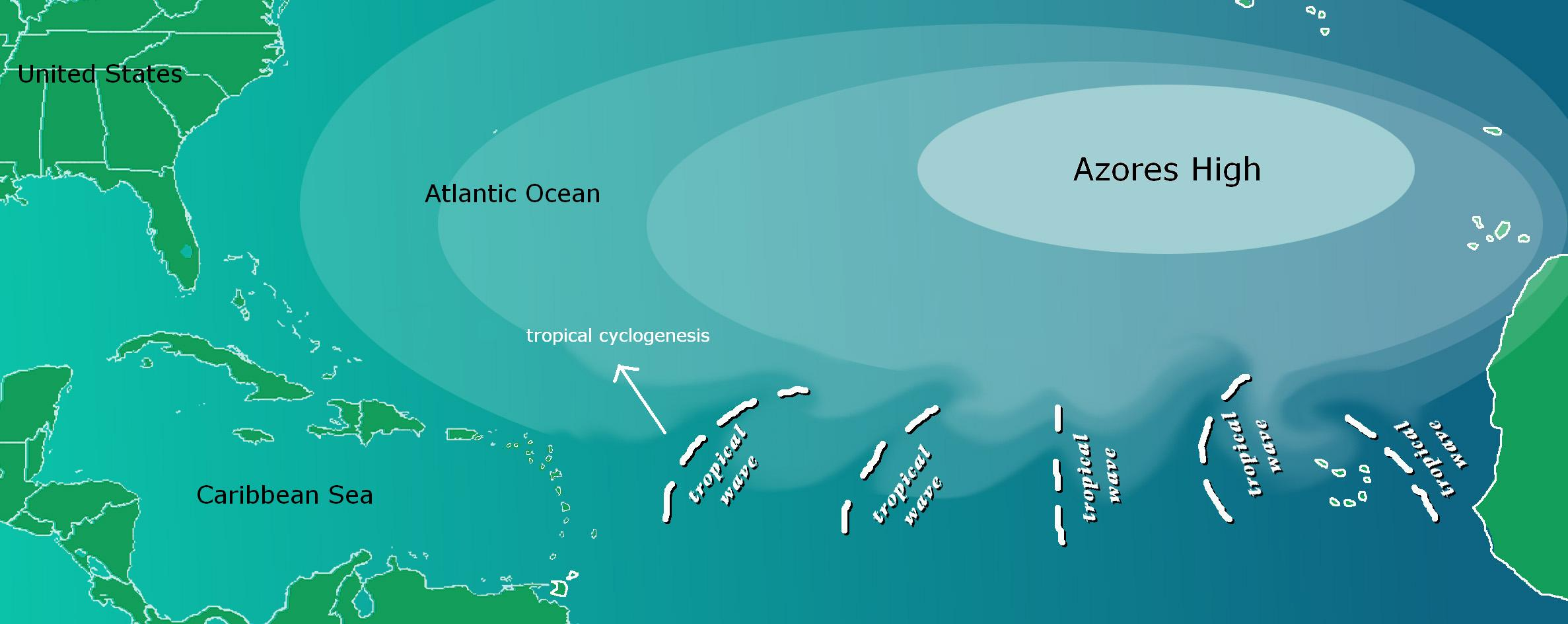
Tropical waves guided west into the Caribbean by the Azores High are a major part of Jamaica's climate. Some waves develop into tropical cyclones.

Tropical cyclones have impacted Jamaica throughout the Atlantic hurricane season between June and November, reflecting a timeframe most conducive to storm development in the Caribbean Sea and Jamaica's rainy season. During the spring, the Azores High shifts north, causing a decrease in wind shear and the strength of trade winds in the Caribbean and resulting in conditions favorable for convection. In summer, tropical waves are steered westward into the Caribbean by the high-pressure area; these are the primary cause of rainfall in Jamaica and may develop further into hurricanes before reaching the island. Climatologically, there are two peaks in Jamaican hurricane activity in August–September and the latter half of October. Hurricane activity near Jamaica is generally minimal until late July. Based on observations between 1886 and 1996, there is a 48 percent chance that at least one hurricane will threaten Jamaica and a 16 percent change that two or more will threaten the country, with a hurricane threat defined as a storm's center passing within 500 km (310 mi) of Jamaica. Tropical waves and tropical cyclones account for 46 percent of destructive floods in Jamaica.

Jamaica's hurricanes typically have tropical origins rather than baroclinic ones; only the 1912 hurricane was of baroclinic nature. All landfalling hurricanes developed south of 15°N, and those that form east of the Windward Islands tend to continue west into the Yucatan Peninsula. On average, the southern coast is the most vulnerable to storm impacts. Most hurricanes impacting Jamaica take a southeast to northwest path, and those that do often approach from south of the island. During the second activity peak in October, storms impacting Jamaica tend to originate from the southern or southwestern Caribbean and are often associated with the monsoon trough rather than tropical waves. These storms develop between Nicaragua and Colombia and track north towards Jamaica.

Hurricane activity tends to be reduced during El Niño events when the eastern Pacific Ocean off the coasts of Peru and Ecuador is abnormally warm, due to an increase in vertical wind shear which is disruptive to hurricanes. This is correlated with a drier and warmer wet season in the Caribbean. Jamaica saw an elevated number of hurricane impacts in the 18th century and early 19th century. There has been an increase in hurricane intensity, frequency, and duration in the Atlantic since the early 1980s. The primary cause remains unknown, with the El Niño-Southern Oscillation (ENSO) and climate change discussed as possible but not definitive causes. Based on a report by the Intergovernmental Panel on Climate Change in 2012, the effects of climate change on storm tracks and frequency are uncertain or marginal, while wind and rainfall intensities are expected to increase.

=== Statistics ===
Storms Affecting Jamaica by month
| Month | Number of Storms |
|---|---|
| June | 3 |
| July | 1 |
| August | 17 |
| September | 8 |
| October | 18 |
| November | 6 |
| Overall | 53 |

Storms affecting Jamaica by period
| Period | Number of storms |
|---|---|
| 1700s | 5 |
| 1800–1870 | 4 |
| 1870–1899 | 8 |
| 1900–1919 | 7 |
| 1920–1939 | 3 |
| 1940–1969 | 9 |
| 1970–1999 | 7 |
| 2000–2025 | 15 |
| Overall | 58 |

== List of storms ==
=== Pre-1900 ===
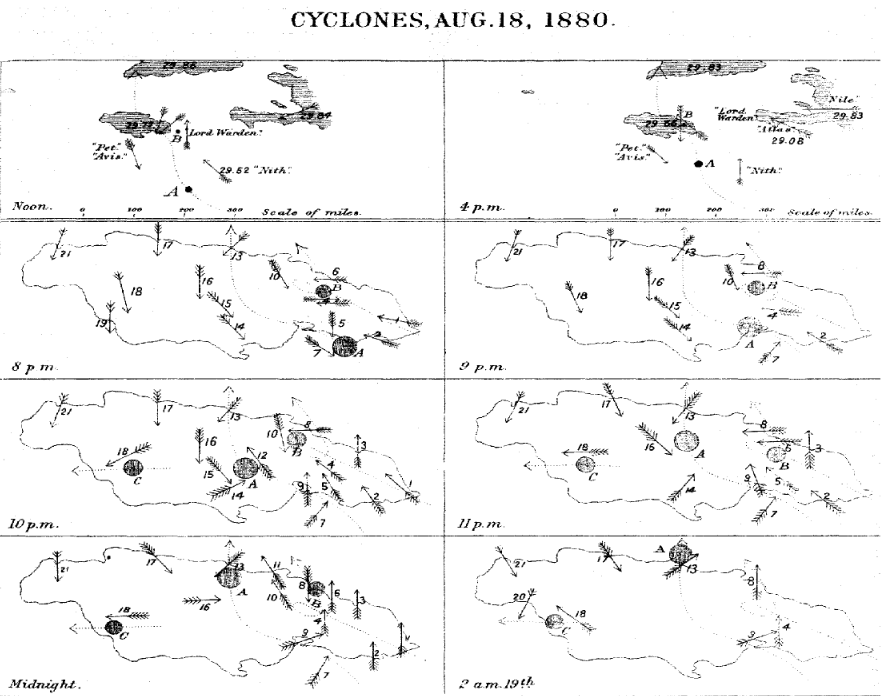
A series of maps showing the 1880 hurricane's crossing of Jamaica, with cyclonic winds revealing the storm's location

- 28 August 1712 – Many homes and plantations were destroyed by a passing hurricane.
- 28 August 1722 – The eye of an intense hurricane crossed Port Royal, bringing a 4.9 m (16 ft) storm surge and causing extensive damage throughout the island. Half of the port's buildings were destroyed, with those built during British rule suffering worse than those built under Spanish rule. Roughly 400 people were killed, and only 4 crew among the 50 ships moored at Port Royal survived. The sinking of the slave ship Kingston alone claimed the lives of two hundred people. Surviving colonists were stricken without basic necessities. The storm's passage was documented in John Atkins' A Voyage to Guinea, Brasil, and the West-Indies (1723).
- 22 October 1726 – A hurricane impacted the eastern part of Jamaica, damaging or sinking 50 ships and toppling several homes in Kingston, Port Royal, and Spanish Town.
- 20 October 1744 – Wharves in Old Harbour, Passage Fort, and Port Royal were destroyed by a hurricane. In harbours, 104 ships capsized. A newly established fort at Mosquito Point was also destroyed. An epidemic followed the storm, claiming additional lives.
- 3 October 1780 – A hurricane's high storm surge destroyed Savanna-la-Mar and heavily impacted the southern coast of Jamaica, particularly southwestern portions.
- 12–14 October 1812 – A large cyclone affected much of the island. Houses were destroyed in Kingston and Savanna-la-Mar.
- 1 August 1813 – A storm disrupted shipping and damaged buildings in Kingston.
- 28 August 1813 – Vessels were wrecked by a storm in Savanna-la-Mar.
- 18–19 October 1815 – Heavy rains attending a storm caused flooding in eastern Jamaica. Homes were destroyed in St. George and St. James.
- 2 November 1874 – A Category 2 hurricane made landfall on Clarendon with winds of 170 km/h (105 mph), causing £75,000 in damage and killing five people. Kingston, St. Ann, and St. Mary suffered the worst impacts. Crops were destroyed throughout the country and entire villages were washed away.
- 11–13 October 1879 – A passing tropical storm causes torrential downpours, dropping 17.80 in (452 mm) of rain in Kingston where 13 fatalities occurred. The deluge swept away bridges, homes, and roads. Coffee and pimento plantations were also badly damaged.
- 19 August 1880 – Kingston was hit by a hurricane, damaging crops and shipping in the city. Up-Park Camp incurred US$50,000 in losses after the military barracks were destroyed. Thirty people were killed in the accompanying floods throughout Jamaica. In Yallahs, 59 homes were destroyed and 3 people were killed. Though listed officially in the Atlantic hurricane database as a minor hurricane, a 2014 analysis by Michael Chenoweth suggested it may have been a major hurricane. Initial reports suggested two tropical cyclones were involved.
- 8 October 1884 – The eastern half of Jamaica is struck by an intensifying tropical storm, producing heavy rainfall over Jamaica. In St. Thomas, 8–9 in (200–230 mm) of rain caused damage to roads and property, as well as "some loss of life". Runoff from the Blue Mountains caused additional flooding in Morant Bay.
- 27 June 1886 – At least 18 people were killed by a tropical storm that may have skirted the northern coast of Jamaica, primarily affecting the eastern half of the island. An 8 ft (2.4 m) surge affected the eastern end of the island, washing away wharves in Boston. Fifteen drowned in Port Royal after their ship was overtaken by the waves.
- 19–20 August 1886 – The center of a Category 2 hurricane crossed Jamaica from the southeast to Montego Bay. At the Morant Point Lighthouse, the shore recessed 124 ft (38 m). In Elmwood, 17 in (430 mm) of rain was recorded.
- 27 October 1899 – A tropical storm that would eventually strengthen into a hurricane slowly moved north from the west of Jamaica. Damage in Black River, Jamaica was significant with “many dead” in Jamaica, although the exact number of fatalities is unknown.
- 8 November 1899 – A tropical storm would make landfall in Saint Thomas Parish, Jamaica at peak intensity as a moderately strong tropical storm. Strong winds and heavy rainfall were reported in Jamaica as significant damage was reported in Port Antonio.

=== 1900–1919 ===
- 11 August 1903 – A moderate Category 3 hurricane made landfall in Jamaica with winds of 120 mph, impacts were heavy and extensive with $10 million (1903 USD), and at least 65 fatalities although other reports have the death count as high as 90.
- 13 June 1904 – An early season Category 1 hurricane slowly moved to the north then northeast bringing heavy rainfall, with over 10 inches (250 mm) of rain.
- 10–18 November 1912 – A strong hurricane struck Jamaica at peak intensity causing extensive damage and large losses of life. In total, 100 fatalities were reported with an estimated damage of $1.5 million (1912 USD).
- 12–13 August 1915 – A hurricane that would eventually strike Texas struck Jamaica at Category 2 status, 15 people were killed from the storm primarily from drowning and an estimated $10 million in damages on the island.
- 24–25 September 1915 – A strong hurricane to the south of Jamaica brought strong gales that were strong enough to cut telecommunications from Kingston to other districts on the island.
- 15–16 August 1916 – A quick moving hurricane struck near Portland Point, Jamaica as a moderate Category 1 killing 17 people and dealing $10 million in damages (equivalent to $290 million in 2024 USD).
- 23 September 1917 – A strong Category 4 hurricane struck Jamaica as a Category 2 hurricane causing significant damages to plantations, cutting off communications in Holland Bay, and killing 9 in Port Antonio.

=== 1920–1939 ===
- 29 October 1933 – A slow moving Category 1 hurricane struck the island at peak intensity before moving into Cuba and The Bahamas and eventually moving out to sea.
- 21 October 1935 – A Category 1 hurricane made landfall on Jamaica as a Tropical Storm before curving around, reaching its first peak as a hurricane bringing further impacts towards the island.
- October 31, 1939 – A Category 1 hurricane passed just north of the island of Jamaica as it weakened to a Tropical Storm after peaking as a hurricane.

=== 1940–1969 ===
- 20 August 1944 – A Category 3 hurricane cut across Jamaica from Boston Bay to Montego Bay, causing widespread destruction along the northern half of the island. Winds of approximately 100–120 mph (160–190 km/h) strike Annotto Bay. An estimated 90 percent of banana trees and 41 percent of coconut trees were lost, with an estimated damage toll in the millions of dollars. At least 30 fatalities were associated with the storm.
- 15–16 October 1950 – Hurricane King would slowly move northeastwards located west of the island, beginning to curve into southeastern Cuba, the slow movement would cause heavy rainfall peaking at 25 in (640 mm) in a span of 48 hours. The extensive downpour caused extensive infrastructural damage across Jamaica.
- 17–18 August 1951 – Hurricane Charlie is considered as Jamaica's deadliest natural disaster of the 20th century. As it made landfall as a high-end Category 3 hurricane, heavy rainfall peaked up to 17 in (430 mm) in the capital city of Kingston. And wind gusts peaked to near 125 mph (201 km/h). Damages amounted up to $50 million (1951 USD) with 152 fatalities blamed on Charlie. It would be the last hurricane to make a direct impact on the island until Hurricane Gilbert 37 years later.
- 11 October 1954 – Hurricane Hazel would slowly move north as it stayed east of the island. Impacts in Jamaica are unknown.
- 26–27 September 1955 – Hurricane Janet passed south of the island as an intensifying hurricane, although the impacts are unknown from the storm.
- 1–2 September 1958 – Hurricane Ella stays relatively to the northeast of the island as the storm moves northwestwards however the impacts from the storm are unknown.
- 15 September 1958 – The remnants of Tropical Storm Gerda passes just to the north of Jamaica.
- 5–7 October 1963 – Hurricane Flora bashed the island with heavy rainfall for several days as it slowly stalled over southeastern Cuba. Rainfall amounts peaked to 60 in (1,500 mm) which caused numerous landslides across the eastern portion of the island. In total, 11 people were killed with $11.9 million (1963 USD) in monetary losses.
- 25 August 1964 – Hurricane Cleo passed just north of Jamaica as a weakening hurricane, hurricane warnings were issued for the island due to Cleo's close approach.
- 12 September 1967 – Hurricane Beulah brushes the island as a minimal tropical storm bringing gale-force winds however no damage was reported.

=== 1970–1999 ===
- 19 October 1973 – Tropical Storm Gilda slowly moved to the north located west of the island causing significant rainfall in a three-day period. Rainfall amounted to 16.2 in (411 mm) in a 24-hour period. This caused mudslides across several parishes particularly in Saint Andrew Parish where several houses were destroyed. In total, six deaths were blamed on Gilda after its slow passage to the north while located west of the island.
- 31 August 1974 – Hurricane Carmen would pass south of Jamaica as an intensifying Category 1 hurricane leading to three fatalities all caused by drowning.
- 12 June 1979 – Tropical Depression One would cause torrential rainfall as it slowly moved north from the west of Jamaica, rainfall amounted to 32 inches (810 mm). Due to the torrential rainfall the slow-moving system produced, 40 fatalities were associated with the system with damages of approximately $27 million (1979 USD).
- 6 August 1980 – Hurricane Allen would make a close approach to the northeast of the island as a Category 4 hurricane causing very significant damage on the northeastern portion of the island. Allen caused eight fatalities and $100 million (1980 USD) in damages.
- 12 September 1988 – Hurricane Gilbert was the second-strongest tropical cyclone on record to make landfall in Jamaica, making landfall as a low-end Category 4 hurricane. Gilbert would cause severe damage across the island with a storm surge produced as high as 19 ft (5.8 m), and brought up to 34.3 in (823 mm) of rain leading to inland flash flooding. In total, 45 deaths were blamed on the storm with damages of $700 million (1988 USD).
- 13 November 1994 – Hurricane Gordon made landfall near Kingston as a minimal tropical storm dropping heavy rainfall towards several parishes. Four deaths were reported with Gordon causing $11.8 million (1994 USD) in damages.
- 1 August 1995 – The far outer bands of Hurricane Erin caused seven fatalities after a fatal plane crash killed five people. Two teenagers also died on a football field in Portmore, Saint Catherine Parish, when lightning associated from Erin struck them.

=== 2000–2025 ===
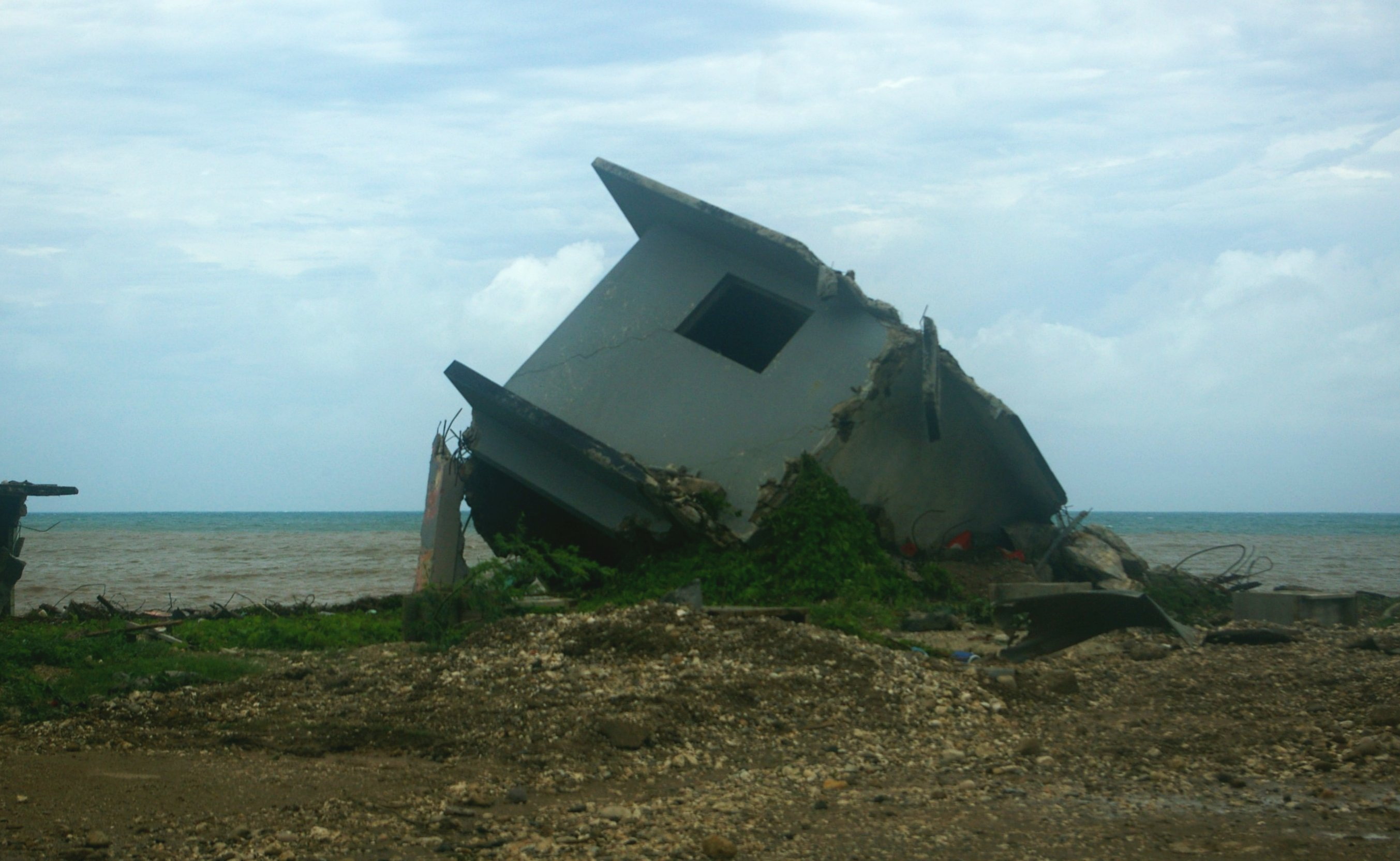
A destroyed concrete waterfront house in Kingston after Hurricane Dean

- 7 October 2001 – Hurricane Iris passed south of Jamaica as a Category 1 destroying two houses and damaged the roofs of two others. One person was injured but overall damage was fairly minimal in Jamaica.
- 11 August 2004 – Hurricane Charley passed by to the south of Jamaica as a Category 1 hurricane bringing heavy winds and rain. One fatality and $4.1 million (2004 USD) were reported from the storm.
- 8 September 2004 – Hurricane Ivan passed incredibly closely to the shores of Portland Point, Jamaica causing significant flooding and damage towards the island, being described as one of the most intense hurricanes in Jamaica's history. In total, 17 fatalities were reported with total damage reported at $575 million (2004 USD).
- 7 July 2005 – Hurricane Dennis brushed the island as a minimal but intensifying Category 3 hurricane bringing immense rainfall amounts reaching 24.54 in (623 mm) leading to 1 fatality and $34.5 million (2005 USD).
- 17–18 October 2005 – Hurricane Wilma would slowly move to the west of Jamaica as a developing Tropical Depression causing heavy rainfall due to Wilma's slow movement pounding the island for 3 days straight leading to 1 death and $93.5 million (2005 USD).
- 19 August 2007 – Hurricane Dean passed 50-60 mi (80 to 95 km) to the south of Jamaica as a Category 4 hurricane causing heavy rainfall which led to flooding and landslides. Dean was blamed for 3 deaths and $300 million (2007 USD).
- 28 August 2008 – Hurricane Gustav made landfall on the eastern tip of Jamaica as a high-end Tropical Storm bringing significant damage to some parishes as it moved slowly to the south then to the west. In all, 15 people were reported dead, with $210 million (2008 USD) in damages.
- 8 November 2008 – Hurricane Paloma would pass north of the island as a moderate Category 4 hurricane causing flooding from the storm's outer bands. The flooding caused $100,000 in crop damage, and killed 1 person due to drowning in Clarendon Parish.
- 24 October 2012 – Hurricane Sandy made landfall near Kingston with winds of 85 mph (137 km/h) which would make it the first hurricane to make landfall on the island since Hurricane Gilbert. A total of 2 fatalities were reported with damage assessed at $100 million (2012 USD).
- 4 July 2021 – Hurricane Elsa would pass just to the north of the island as a Tropical Storm leading to flash flooding in many communities. Over 5 inches (230 mm) were recorded in at least one location.
- 17 August 2021 – Hurricane Grace made landfall on Jamaica as a weak but strengthening Tropical Storm, wind gusts of up to 53 mph (85 km/h), heavy rainfall totaled 9.8 in (248 mm) both recorded in Kingston.
- 26 September 2022 – Hurricane Ian passed to the west of Jamaica as an intensifying tropical storm, caused minor flooding to the island. No fatalities were reported and the damage stood at $5.86 million (2022 USD).
- 3 July 2024 – Hurricane Beryl passed just south of Jamaica as a Category 4 hurricane, hammering the island with heavy winds and rain. At least 4 fatalities were reported with damage estimates up to $204 million (2024 USD).
- 5 November 2024 – Hurricane Rafael would pass just west of Jamaica as an intensifying tropical storm. Maximum rainfall measured 3 in (7.6 cm) in several of Jamaica's southern parishes. So far as of 5 January, Two people have been found dead after being swept away in floodwaters in a vehicle in St. Catherine. Total damage was recorded to be US$8 million.
- 28 October 2025 – Hurricane Melissa made landfall in southwest Jamaica as the strongest Atlantic hurricane landfall on record in terms of pressure, tied with the 1935 Labor Day hurricane at 892 mbar. Melissa far exceeded Gilbert's low-end Category 4 landfall, the previous strongest landfall in recorded Jamaican history. Damage was estimated to be around US$9 billion, making it the costliest storm in Jamaican history.

== See also ==
- Hurricanes in the Bahama Archipelago
- List of Cayman Islands hurricanes
- List of Hispaniola hurricanes
- List of Cuba hurricanes
