= 1912 Atlantic hurricane season =

- Season summary map

Seasonal boundaries
- First system formed: April 4, 1912
- Last system dissipated: November 21, 1912

Strongest storm
- Name: Seven
  - Maximum winds: 115 mph (185 km/h) (1-minute sustained)
  - Lowest pressure: 965 mbar (hPa; 28.5 inHg)

Seasonal statistics
- Total depressions: 11
- Total storms: 7
- Hurricanes: 4
- Major hurricanes (Cat. 3+): 1
- Total fatalities: 122
- Total damage: $1.6 million (1912 USD)

Related articles
- 1910–19 Pacific hurricane seasons; 1902-19 Pacific typhoon seasons; 1910s North Indian Ocean cyclone seasons

The 1912 Atlantic hurricane season was an average hurricane season that featured the first recorded November major hurricane (Category 3 or higher on the modern day Saffir–Simpson scale). There were eleven tropical cyclones, seven of which became tropical storms; four of those strengthened into hurricanes, and one reached major hurricane intensity. The season's first cyclone developed on April 4, while the final dissipated on November 21. The season's most intense and most devastating tropical cyclone was the final storm, known as the Jamaica hurricane. It produced heavy rainfall on Jamaica, leading to at least 100 fatalities and about $1.5 million (1912 USD) in damage. The storm was also blamed for five deaths in Cuba.

Other tropical cyclones that left notable impact include the fourth and sixth hurricanes. The former brought rough seas and storm surge to portions of the Gulf Coast of the United States, leaving locally severe damage, particularly in Mobile, Alabama, and Pensacola, Florida, totaling about $39,000. One fatality occurred after a barge capsized. The sixth hurricane brought rough seas and heavy precipitation to northeastern Mexico and south Texas, with flooding reported inland. The storm left 15 deaths and about $28,000 in damage. Overall, the tropical cyclones of this season collectively caused at least 122 fatalities and just under $1.6 million in damage.

The season's activity was reflected with an accumulated cyclone energy (ACE) rating of 57, near the 1911–1920 average of 58.7. ACE is a metric used to express the energy used by a tropical cyclone during its lifetime. Therefore, a storm with a longer duration will have high values of ACE. It is only calculated at six-hour increments in which specific tropical and subtropical systems are either at or above sustained wind speeds of 39 mph (63 km/h), which is the threshold for tropical storm intensity. Thus, tropical depressions are not included here.

== Systems ==
=== Tropical Storm One ===
- Tropical storm (SSHWS)
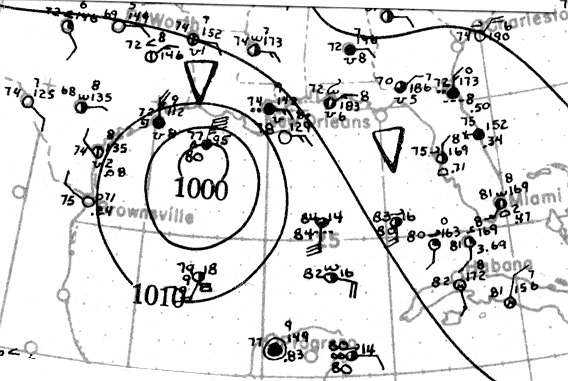
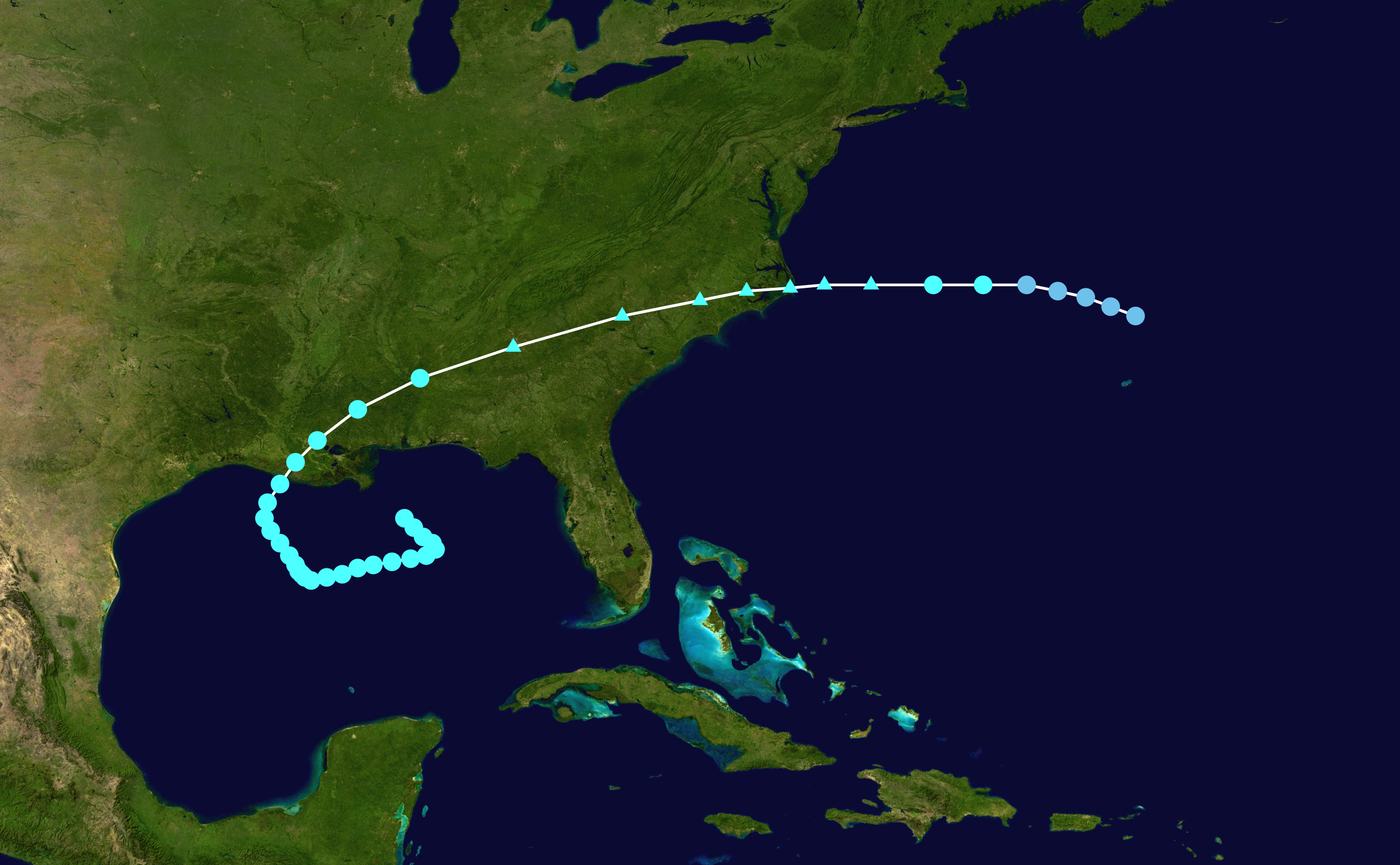
- Duration: June 7 – June 17
- Peak intensity: 70 mph (110 km/h) (1-min); 995 mbar (hPa)

On June 7, ships in the Gulf of Mexico reported a low pressure area with a closed circulation about 100 mi (160 km) southeast of Port Eads, Louisiana. Initially, the storm moved slowly southeastward, before turning west-southwestward late on June 8. Strengthening slightly, the cyclone turned to the northwest by June 11. Around 12:00 UTC on the following day, a ship observed a barometric pressure of 995 mbar (29.4 inHg), the lowest known in relation to the storm. Based on this, maximum sustained winds were estimated at 70 mph (110 km/h). Early on June 13, the storm curved northeastward and made landfall near Franklin, Louisiana, around 05:00 UTC. The system slowly weakened and emerged into the Atlantic Ocean from the Outer Banks of North Carolina, while still at tropical storm intensity. By 12:00 UTC on June 16, the cyclone weakened to a tropical depression. About 24 hours later, the depression dissipated about 150 mi (240 km) north of Bermuda.

In Louisiana, heavy rainfall resulted in some flooding in inland areas. Precipitation in Georgia and South Carolina caused rivers to approach or reach flood stage, necessitating a flood stage warning at Cheraw, South Carolina, along the Pee Dee River. There, the Pee Dee River crested at 27.5 ft (8.4 m), about 0.5 ft (0.15 m) above flood stage. Some locations in eastern North Carolina reported strong winds, particularly at Fayetteville, where there was a "severe local storm".

=== Tropical Storm Two ===
- Tropical storm (SSHWS)
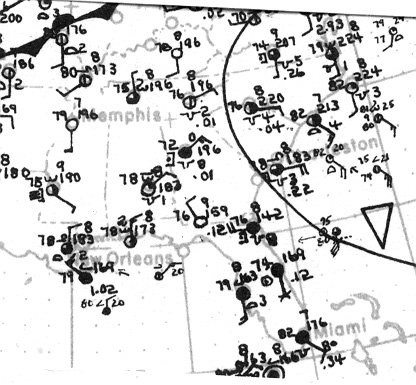
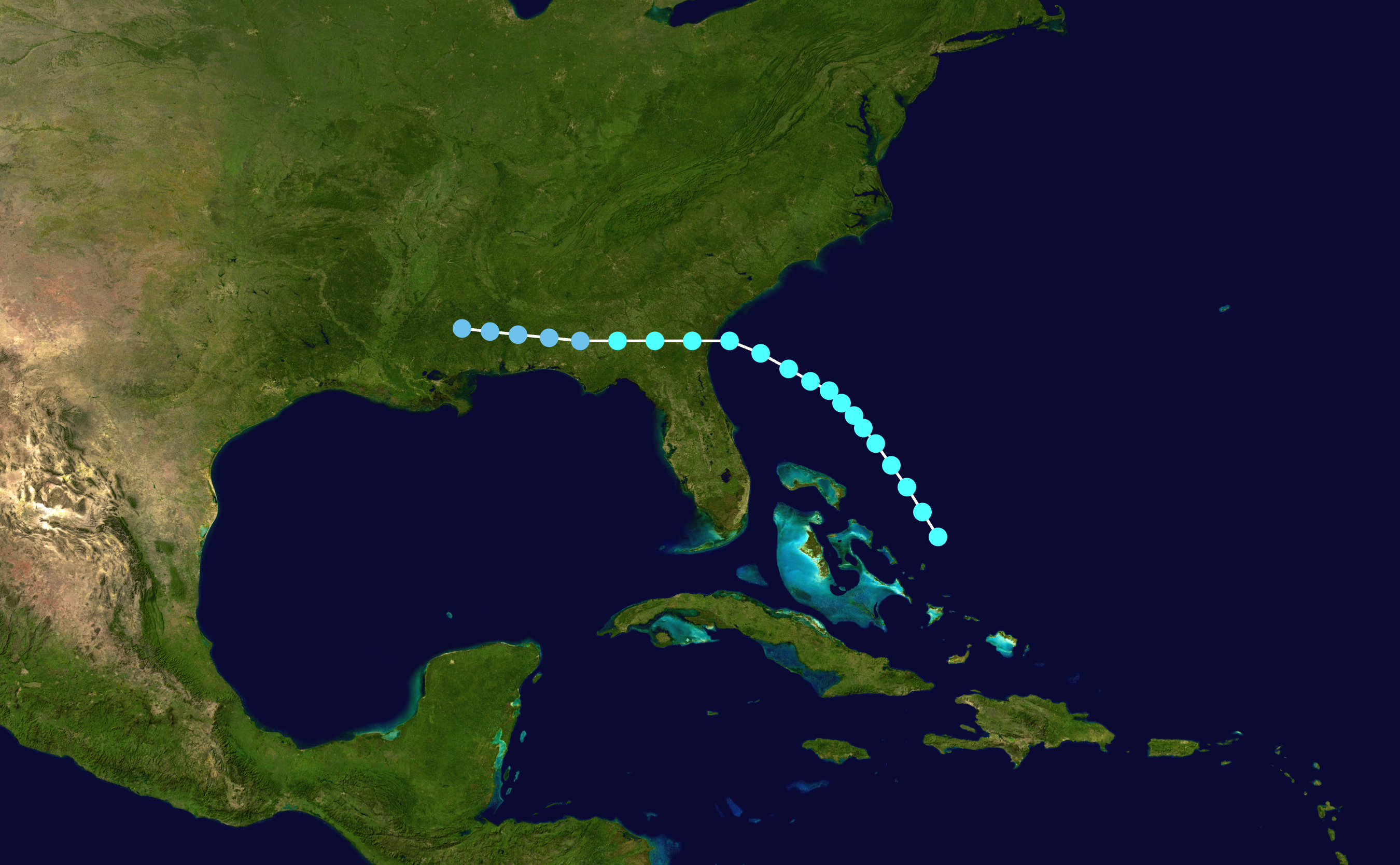
- Duration: July 12 – July 17
- Peak intensity: 50 mph (85 km/h) (1-min); <1011 mbar (hPa)

A ship initially encountered this storm about 65 mi (105 km) north-northeast of San Salvador Island in the Bahamas on July 12. The storm initially moved northwestward and strengthened slowly. Early on July 14, the cyclone turned west-northwestward. Later that day, a ship recorded a barometric pressure of 1,011 mbar (29.9 inHg), which was the lowest pressure in relation to the cyclone. Around 12:00 UTC on July 15, the system peaked with maximum sustained winds of 50 mph (85 km/h), based on an observation from Savannah, Georgia. About three hours later, the storm made landfall near Darien, Georgia. The cyclone slowly weakened inland and fell to tropical depression status by 12:00 UTC on July 16. About twenty four hours, it dissipated over Mississippi.

Prior to the storm's landfall, northeast storm warnings were issued from Jacksonville, Florida, to Charleston, South Carolina. At Tybee Island in Georgia, strong winds and abnormally high tides were reported. In Savannah, a wind speed of 49 mph (79 km/h) was reported. The storm resulted in minimal damage.

=== Tropical Storm Three ===
- Tropical storm (SSHWS)
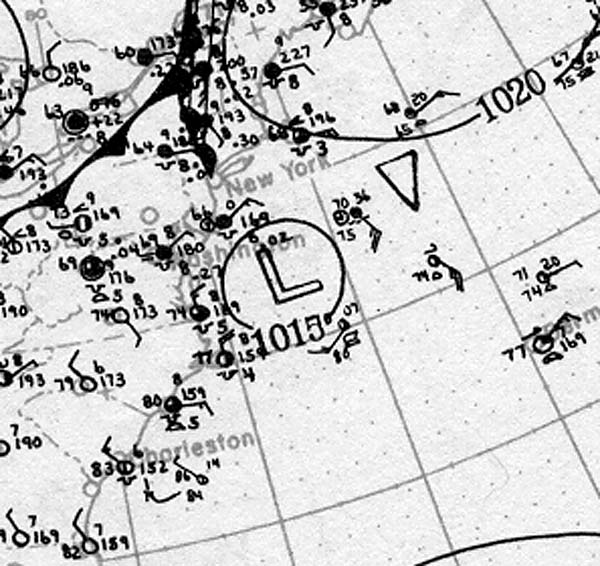
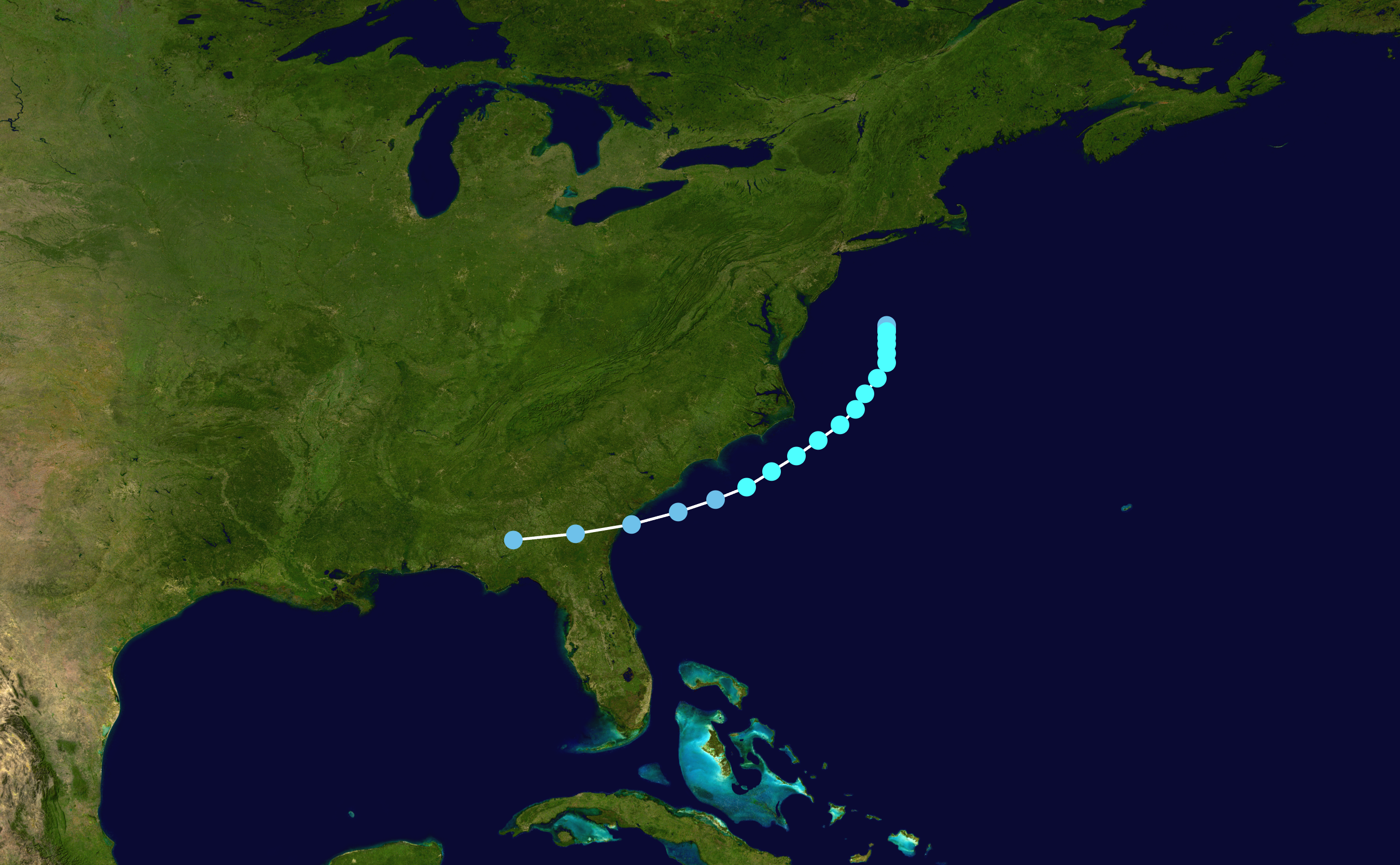
- Duration: September 2 – September 6
- Peak intensity: 50 mph (85 km/h) (1-min); <1007 mbar (hPa)

A tropical depression formed about 140 mi (230 km) east-southeast of Ocean City, Maryland, early on September 2. The depression drifted southward and reached tropical storm intensity later that day. Based on observations from ships on September 3, the cyclone peaked with maximum sustained winds of 50 mph (85 km/h) and a minimum barometric pressure of 1,007 mbar (29.7 inHg). The storm then began moving southwestward at a faster pace. Late on September 5, the cyclone weakened to a tropical depression and curved west-southwestward. Shortly after 06:00 UTC on September 6, the system made landfall near Midway, Georgia, with winds of 35 mph (55 km/h). About 12 hours later, the depression dissipated over southwest Georgia. The strongest wind speed associated with the storm was 37 mph (60 km/h) in Charleston, South Carolina.

=== Hurricane Four ===
- Category 1 hurricane (SSHWS)
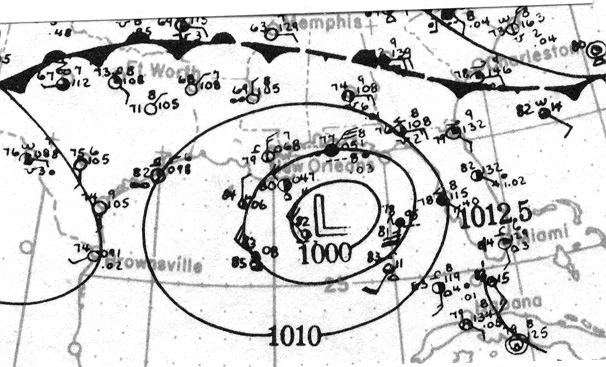
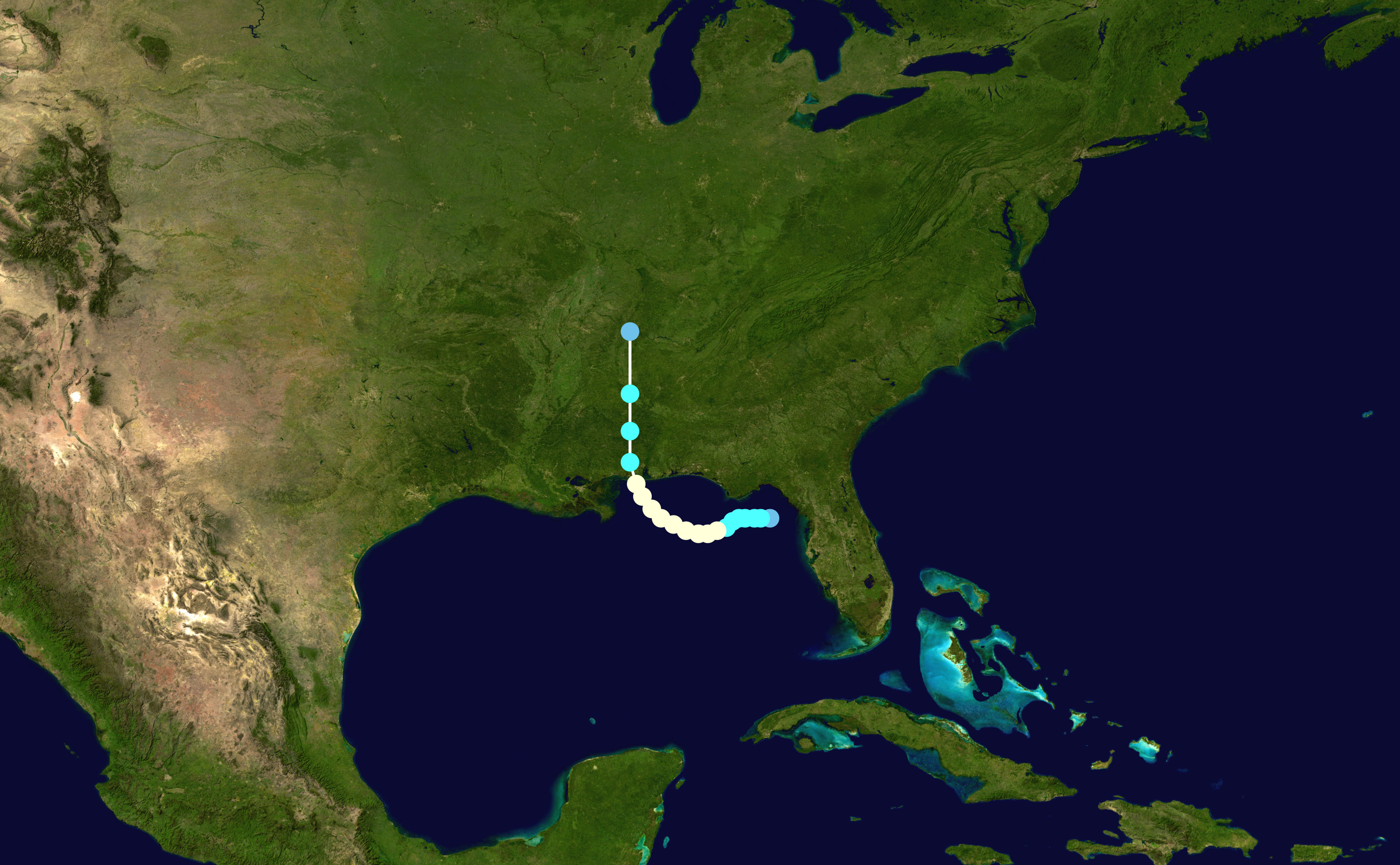
- Duration: September 10 – September 15
- Peak intensity: 90 mph (150 km/h) (1-min); <986 mbar (hPa)

A trough of low pressure in the northeastern Gulf of Mexico developed into a tropical depression about 60 mi (100 km) west-southwest of Cedar Key, Florida, on September 10. Shortly thereafter, the depression intensified into a tropical storm. Moving generally westward, the storm intensified into a Category 1 hurricane on the modern day Saffir–Simpson scale early on September 12. The cyclone peaked with maximum sustained winds of 90 mph (150 km/h) at 00:00 UTC on September 13, observed by a ship. Around this time, the hurricane began to curve northwestward. While approaching the Gulf Coast of the United States, the system weakened. At 08:00 UTC on September 14, the hurricane made landfall near Pascagoula, Mississippi, with winds of 75 mph (120 km/h). A barometric pressure of 986 mbar (29.1 inHg) was observed at landfall, the lowest known in relation to the cyclone. The system quickly weakened to a tropical storm just four hours after landfall. Early on September 15, the storm weakened to a tropical depression and dissipated over Tennessee.

In Florida, the precursor to the hurricane brought heavy rainfall to Tampa, with 13.19 in (335 mm) falling there between September 7 and September 10. Hundreds of homes and numerous acres of agricultural lands were flooded. Throughout the area, many streets were washed out, disrupting street car service and commuting. In Pensacola, abnormally high tides caused severe damage. Wharves and small buildings used for storing fishing equipment washed away. About 20 barges were beached, strewing timber across the beach. Service via the Louisville and Nashville Railroad was briefly interrupted due to timber on a railroad bridge. Wind damage was relatively minor. A dance pavilion on Santa Rosa Island was partially deroofed, as was a hotel. Damage in Pensacola reached approximately $25,000 (1912 USD). In Alabama, the city of Mobile in particular suffered impact from the storm. Some ships and vessels capsized in the Mobile Bay and Mobile River, including a $2,000 barge, drowning a watchman. Winds destroyed a church, though wind damage was otherwise limited to downed street signs and fences. Overall, the hurricane caused $39,000 in damage.

=== Hurricane Five ===
- Category 1 hurricane (SSHWS)
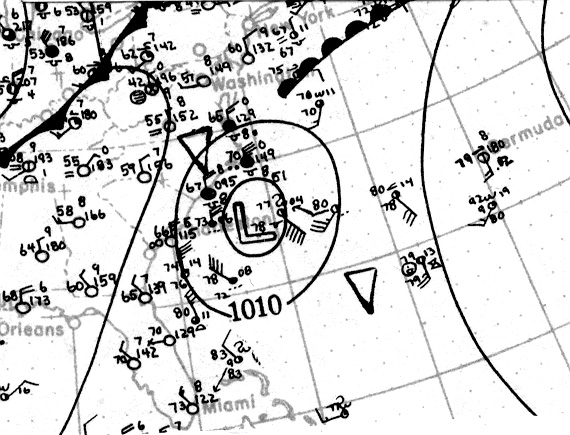
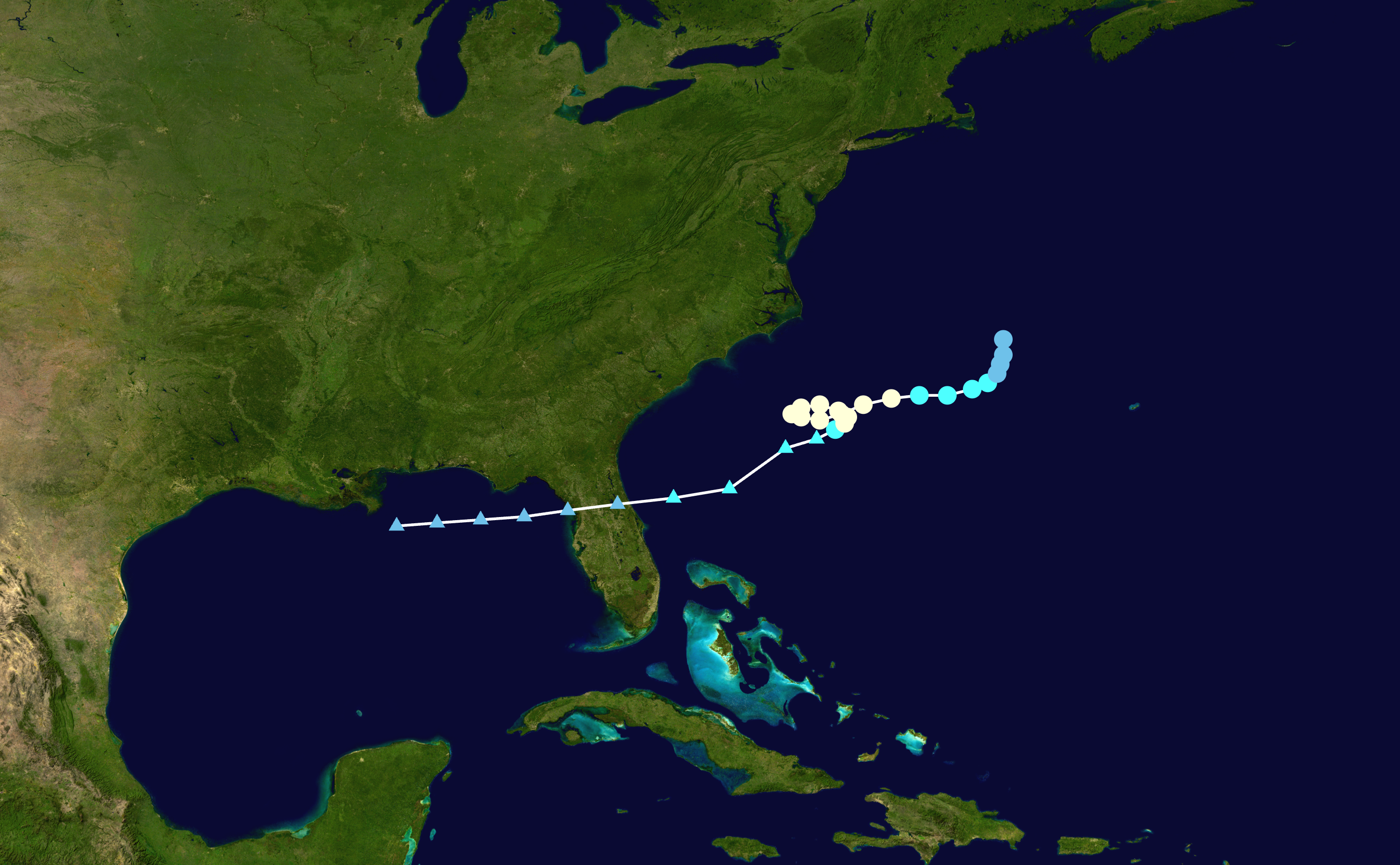
- Duration: October 6 – October 10
- Peak intensity: 90 mph (150 km/h) (1-min); <996 mbar (hPa)

In late September, a cold front moved into the Gulf of Mexico. By October 3, a low pressure associated with the front developed. Initially extratropical, the low moved east-northeastward and crossed Florida on October 4. After entering the Atlantic early on October 5, the low began strengthening and soon reached the equivalency in intensity to a tropical storm. Around 00:00 UTC on October 6, the system transitioned into a tropical cyclone while situated about 260 mi (420 km) southeast of Cape Fear in North Carolina. Already a strong tropical storm, the cyclone intensified into a hurricane about six hours later. Late on October 6, a vessel observed a barometric pressure of 996 mbar (29.4 inHg), the lowest in relation to the stop. Based on this, it is estimated that the hurricane peaked with maximum sustained winds of 90 mph (150 km/h). The storm then began to execute a small cyclonic loop, which continued until early on October 8. By then, the cyclone was moving eastward and weakened to a tropical storm around 00:00 UTC on October 9. About 24 hours later, the system weakened to a tropical depression. At 18:00 UTC on October 10, the depression dissipated about 280 mi (450 km) northeast of Bermuda.

Despite remaining well offshore during its tropical cyclone stage, a wind speed of 46 mph (74 km/h) was observed at Cape Hatteras, North Carolina.

=== Hurricane Six ===
- Category 2 hurricane (SSHWS)
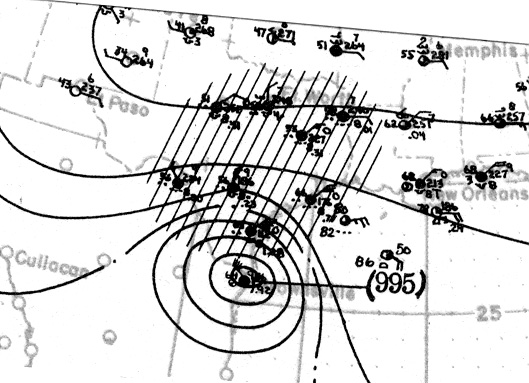
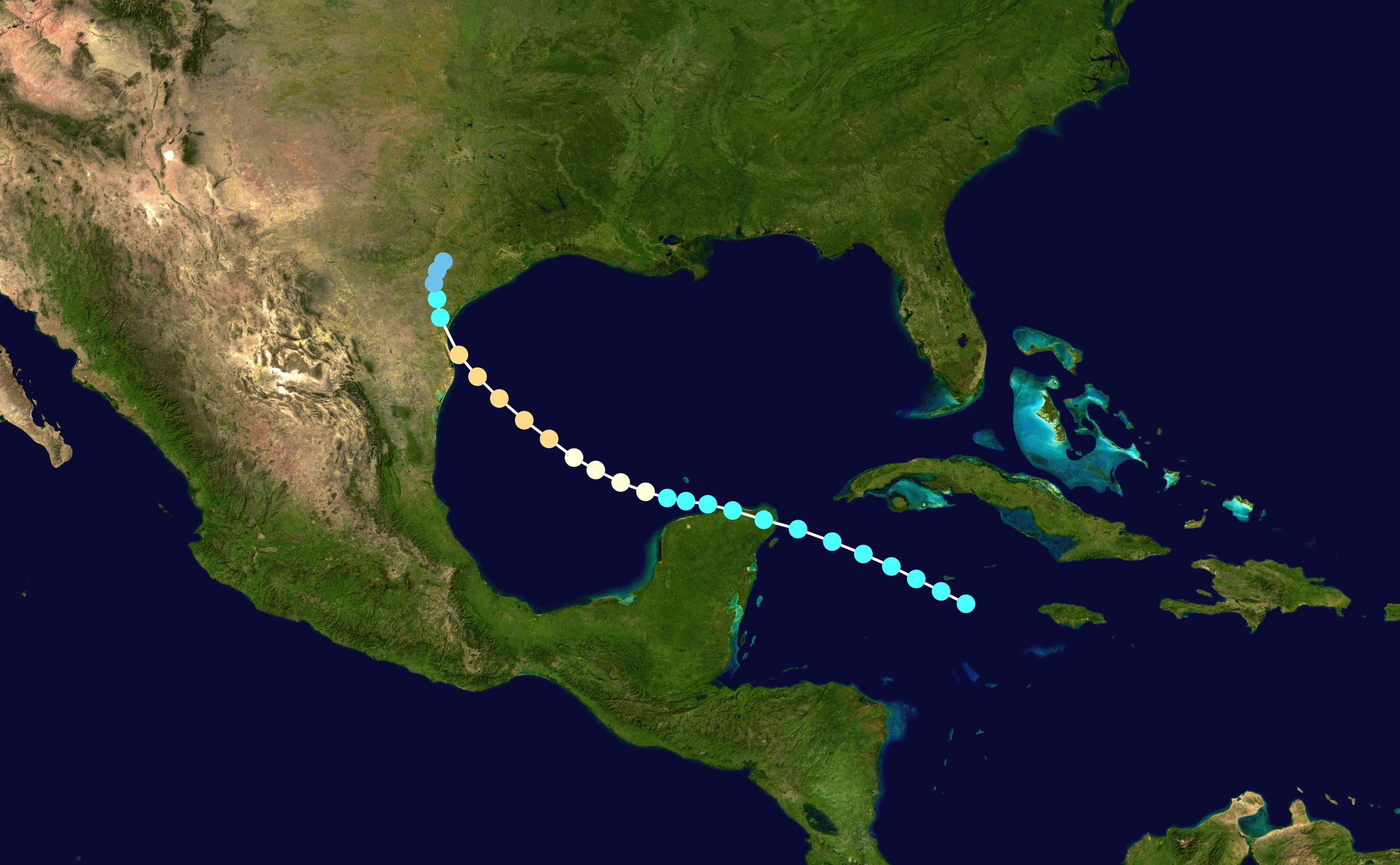
- Duration: October 11 – October 18
- Peak intensity: 100 mph (155 km/h) (1-min); 970 mbar (hPa)

Observations from ships first indicated the presence of a tropical storm to the southeast of the Cayman Islands on October 11. Moving west-northwestward, the storm strengthened steadily, reaching winds of 70 mph (110 km/h) before making landfall near Cancún, Quintana Roo, early on October 13. The system weakened slightly over land and while situated in the Gulf of Mexico just north of the Yucatán Peninsula, but began re-intensifying later that day. By 12:00 UTC on October 14, the cyclone deepened into a Category 1 hurricane and then a Category 2 hurricane about 24 hours later. The hurricane made landfall on central Padre Island between Corpus Christi and Port Mansfield in Texas late on October 16 with winds of 100 mph (155 km/h), estimated based on a storm surge of 6 ft (1.8 m). A barometric pressure of 970 mbar (29 inHg) was estimated using the pressure-wind relationship. The system quickly weakened to a tropical storm early on October 17, several hours before weakening to a tropical depression. The storm dissipated early on October 18.

Offshore Padre Island, the Mexican streamer SS Nicaragua capsized with a crew of 27. Thirteen people, including the captain, were rescued by personnel from the United States Life-Saving Service station in Port Aransas, though six other crew members were lost. Storm surge and abnormally high tides resulted in severe damage along the coast. Brazos and Padre islands were inundated for several hours, with several buildings being swept away. Considerable damage also occurred in due to strong winds and tides in Brownsville and Port Isabel. At the former, a number of windmills, trees, and poorly constructed buildings suffered some degree of damage. Brownsville and Raymondville broke daily rainfall records, with 6.34 in (161 mm) and 4.9 in (120 mm) observed on October 17, respectively. Many buildings were destroyed and several boats sunk after tides rose 6 ft (1.8 m) in less than 4 hours. Fifteen people died and damage reached more than $28,000 (1912 USD).

=== Hurricane Seven ===
- Category 3 hurricane (SSHWS)
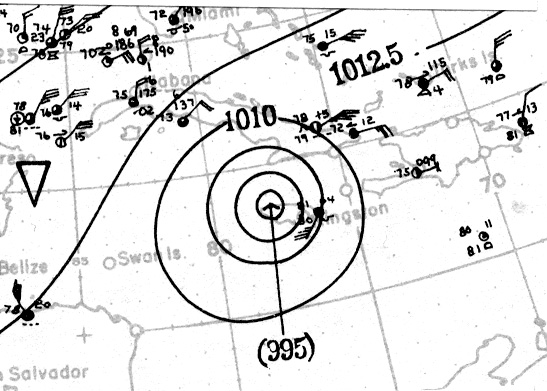
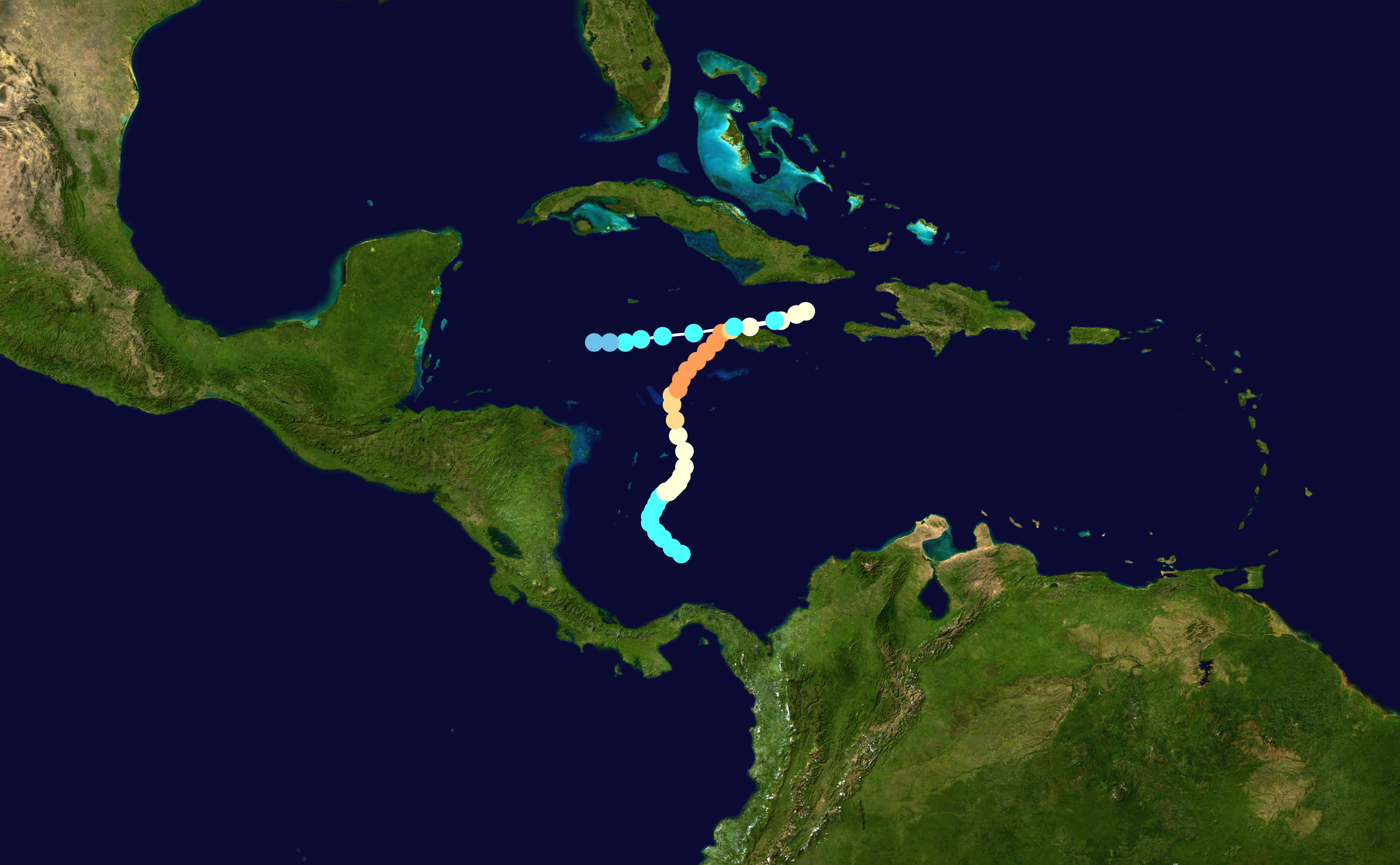
- Duration: November 11 – November 21
- Peak intensity: 115 mph (185 km/h) (1-min); 965 mbar (hPa)

The Jamaica Hurricane of 1912

A low pressure area in the southwestern Caribbean Sea developed into a tropical storm by 06:00 UTC on November 11. Initially, the storm moved slowly northwestward, before eventually curving north-northeastward. Late on November 13, the cyclone intensified into a hurricane, based on a ship report. Slow intensification took place after classification as a hurricane, though after recurving toward northeastward, the storm began to quicken in strengthening. Early on November 17, the hurricane reached its maximum sustained wind speed of 115 mph (185 km/h). It continued north-northeastward and made landfall near Negril, Jamaica, around 12:00 UTC. At South Negril Point, a barometric pressure of 965 mbar (28.5 inHg) was observed, the lowest known in relation to the storm. The storm weakened after landfall and the trend continued after reentry into the Caribbean Sea. On November 20, the hurricane weakened to a tropical storm north of Jamaica. The system then westward across the Caribbean, before dissipating on November 22 about 115 mi (185 km) southwest of Grand Cayman.

Heavy rainfall was reported in Jamaica. Several bridges were severely damaged in the northern and eastern portions of the island. Strong winds generated by the storm destroyed approximately 25% of banana trees, while telegraph lines were downed in a number of places. Railway lines were also heavily damaged by the winds and rain. Rough seas also lashed the island, with Savanna-la-Mar suffering near complete destruction and 42 deaths in that city alone. Across western Jamaica, roughly a hundred homes were destroyed, while 5,000 buildings were damaged or demolished. About 100 fatalities and $1.5 million in damage occurred in Jamaica. Extensive flooding and five fatalities occurred in Cuba in the Guantánamo Bay area.

=== Other systems ===
In addition to the seven tropical storms, four tropical depressions developed and remained below tropical storm intensity. The first formed from an extratropical cyclone well to the southwest of the Azores on April 4. The depression moved southwestward until being by a frontal boundary on April 6. By September 25, another tropical depression developed from a formerly extratropical cyclone about halfway between Bermuda and the Azores. However, on September 27, the depression lost tropical characteristics again. The next tropical depression formed on October 17 to the southeast of Bermuda. Moving generally northwestward, the depression transitioned into an extratropical cyclone by October 21. The final non-developing depression formed from an extratropical cyclone to the west of the Canary Islands on November 7. The depression tracked generally westward before being absorbed by a frontal system on November 11.

== See also ==
- 1900–1940 South Pacific cyclone seasons
- 1900–1950 South-West Indian Ocean cyclone seasons
- 1910s Australian region cyclone seasons
