= 1912 Jamaica hurricane =

Category 3 Atlantic hurricane

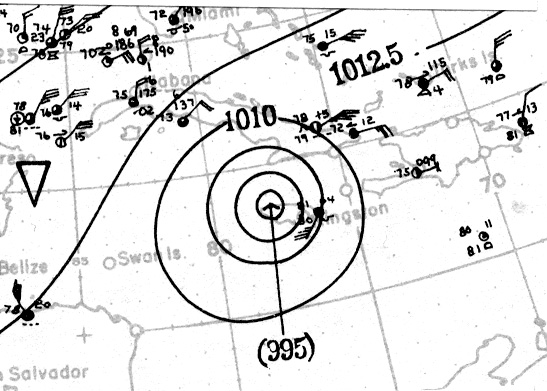
- Surface weather analysis of the hurricane skirting Jamaica on November 18

Meteorological history
- Formed: November 11, 1912
- Dissipated: November 22, 1912

Category 3 major hurricane
- 1-minute sustained (SSHWS/NWS)
- Highest winds: 115 mph (185 km/h)
- Lowest pressure: 965 mbar (hPa); 28.50 inHg

Overall effects
- Fatalities: 105
- Damage: $1.5 million (1912 USD)
- Areas affected: Cuba, Jamaica
- IBTrACS
- Part of the 1912 Atlantic hurricane season

The 1912 Jamaica hurricane was a slow-moving tropical cyclone that meandered about the island of Jamaica, causing torrential rainfall and severe flooding in November 1912. The strongest hurricane in the Atlantic that year, the cyclone formed from a low pressure area in the southwestern Caribbean Sea early on November 11. Initially, the storm tracked slowly to northwest, before eventually curving north-northeastward. Late on November 13, the cyclone became a hurricane. After reaching hurricane status, further deepening was slow, though after recurving toward northeastward, the storm began to quicken its rate of intensification. Early on November 17, the system peaked as a 115 mph (185 km/h) Category 3 hurricane on the modern day Saffir–Simpson hurricane wind scale. It continued north-northeastward and made landfall near Negril, Jamaica, on November 18. The storm weakened continually after landfall and reentry into the Caribbean Sea. On November 20, the hurricane weakened to a tropical storm north of Jamaica. The system tracked westward across the Caribbean, before dissipating on November 22 to the southwest of Grand Cayman.

Heavy rainfall was reported in Jamaica, with as much as 36 inches (910 mm) of precipitation recorded in some areas. Several bridges were severely damaged in the northern and eastern portions of the island. Strong winds generated by the storm destroyed approximately 25% of banana trees, while telegraph lines were downed in a number of places. Railway lines were also heavily damaged by the winds and rain. Rough seas also lashed the island, with Savanna-la-Mar suffering near complete destruction and 42 deaths in that city alone. Across western Jamaica, roughly a hundred homes were destroyed, while 5,000 buildings were damaged or demolished. About 100 fatalities and $1.5 million (1912 USD) in damage occurred in Jamaica. Extensive flooding and five fatalities occurred in Cuba in the Guantánamo Bay area.

== Meteorological history ==
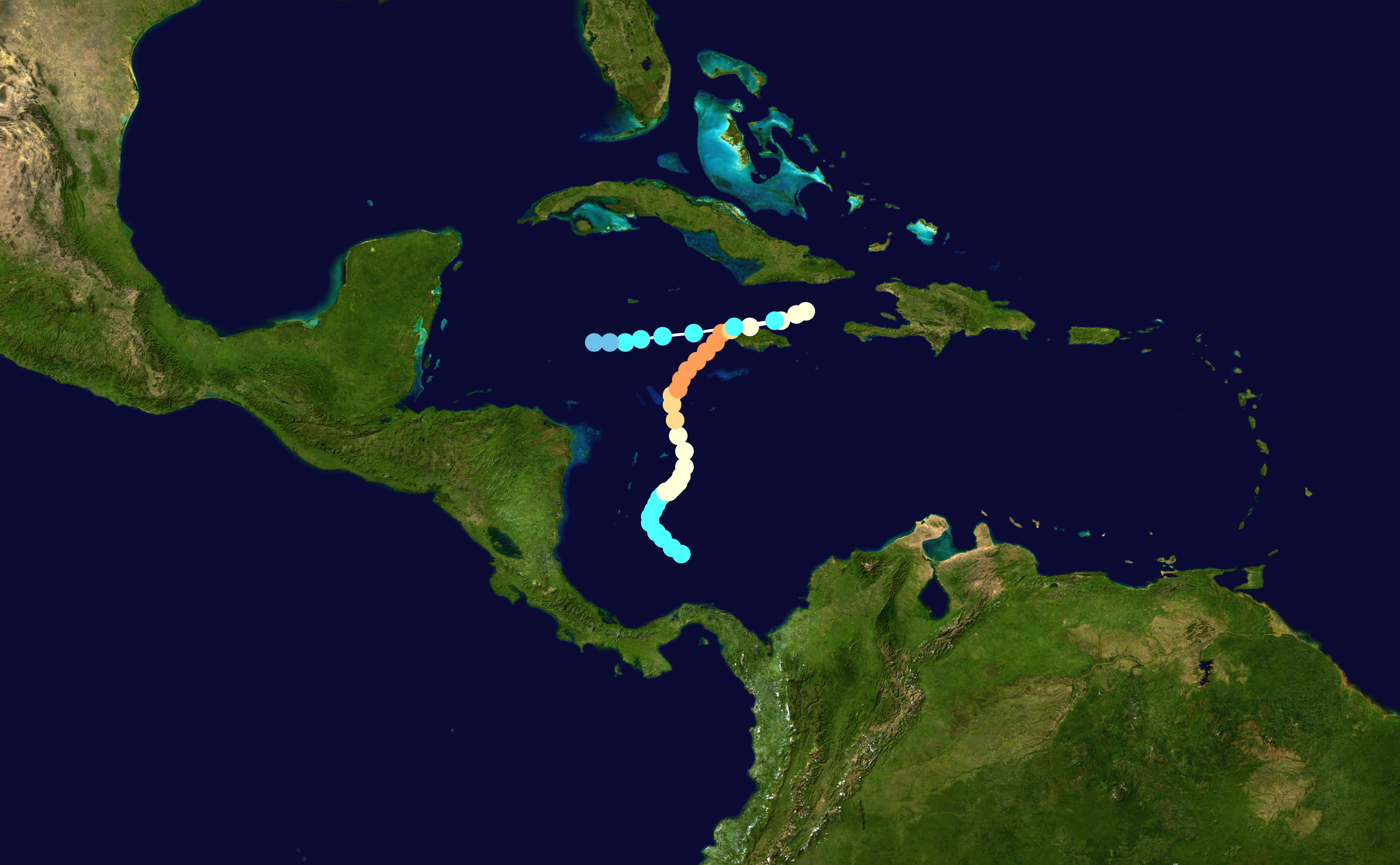
Map plotting the storm's track and intensity, according to the Saffir–Simpson scale Map key Saffir–Simpson scale Tropical depression (≤38 mph, ≤62 km/h) Tropical storm (39–73 mph, 63–118 km/h) Category 1 (74–95 mph, 119–153 km/h) Category 2 (96–110 mph, 154–177 km/h) Category 3 (111–129 mph, 178–208 km/h) Category 4 (130–156 mph, 209–251 km/h) Category 5 (≥157 mph, ≥252 km/h) Unknown Storm type Tropical cyclone Subtropical cyclone Extratropical cyclone, remnant low, tropical disturbance, or monsoon depression

The origins of the 1912 Jamaica hurricane can be definitively traced to a low-pressure area first identified on November 10 in the central Caribbean Sea, south of Hispaniola. Although a tropical wave that crossed the Lesser Antilles several days prior was believed to be a possible precursor to the hurricane, this could not be fully concluded due to the lack of observations in the eastern Caribbean Sea. Early on November 11, the development of a closed atmospheric circulation led to the classification of a tropical storm about 110 mi (180 km) north of Cacique, Colón, in Panama at 06:00 UTC that day. Decreasing barometric pressures in the region confirmed the presence of a cohesive and developing system. The tropical cyclone remained weak as it moved slowly northward, but gradually intensified into a Category 1 hurricane on the modern day Saffir–Simpson hurricane wind scale east of Nicaragua at 18:00 UTC on November 13. A ship at or near the storm's center during that time documented a pressure of 992 mbar (hPa; 29.30 inHg).

Slow intensification took place after classification as a hurricane, though after recurving northeastward, the storm began to quicken in strengthening. On November 18, the cyclone reached its peak intensity with maximum sustained winds of 115 mph (185 km/h), making it equivalent to a Category 3 hurricane. Initially, it was believed that the storm became a Category 4 hurricane, but this was determined to be too strong of an intensity. A relatively small tropical cyclone, the hurricane made landfall along the western coast of Jamaica late on November 18. At the time of landfall, a pressure of 965 mbar (hPa; 28.50 inHg) at South Negril Point — the lowest barometric pressure documented anywhere during the storm's existence. Despite only briefly moving inland, the hurricane quickly weakened after landfall and continued to do so upon reentry into the Caribbean Sea. On November 20, the hurricane weakened to a tropical storm south of Cuba. Due to ambiguous surface observations in the area at the time, the storm was originally believed to have progressed northwards through the Atlantic before clipping Newfoundland; another scenario indicating that the storm made landfall in New York also seemed possible. However, reanalysis concluded that the system instead tracked westward across the Caribbean, slowly weakening before dissipating on November 22 north of Honduras.

== Impact and aftermath ==
While the hurricane was developing in the southern Caribbean Sea, its outer rainbands caused extremely heavy rainfall in the Jamaican parishes of Saint Thomas, Portland, Saint Andrew, and Saint Mary. During the period extending from November 10–12, as much as 36 in (910 mm) of precipitation was recorded, causing extensive flooding and damaging roads. In eastern and northern areas of Jamaica, bridges were heavily damaged. Strong winds associated with these rainbands blew down a multitude of banana trees, with overall losses estimated at 25%. The United Fruit Company sustained heavy losses due to the damage to banana trees, including several banana plantations reporting losses as high as 60% individually. These losses exacerbated bananas losses sustained during the passage of another hurricane in August 1912. Conditions on the island worsened as the hurricane neared the coast, with railway lines heavily damaged by the winds and rain. Telegraph lines were downed, cutting communications.

The combination of rough seas and winds uprooted long stretches of trees and wrecked numerous ships. The entire town of Savanna-la-Mar was nearly destroyed by the hurricane's effects, which included damage to several local churches. The storm also virtually destroyed the communities of Green Island, Lucea, and Negril, where a church remained the only standing structure. In Montego Bay, at least 300 people were left homeless, many of whom temporarily lived in the courthouse after losing their homes. A total of 42 people were killed in the city. Several other wharves along the coast were swept away due to the waves and wind. Across western Jamaica, roughly a hundred homes were destroyed, while 5,000 buildings were damaged or demolished. Due to the destruction caused by the tropical cyclone, Jamaica governor Sydney Olivier, 1st Baron Olivier assessed damage in the western portion of the island. The government of Jamaica ordered the dispatch of artillerymen in order to bring 300 tents and other relief supplies to impacted regions. Additionally, money was raised to aid those who became homeless.

In Cuba, the storm primarily effected Guantánamo Bay, causing extensive flooding in the area. There were five fatalities, four of which were fishermen who drowned and another person died after injuries suffered during a building collapsed.

== See also ==
- List of Category 3 Atlantic hurricanes
- 1903 Jamaica hurricane
- 1909 Greater Antilles hurricane
- 1916 Texas hurricane
- 1935 Jérémie hurricane
- 1944 Jamaica hurricane
- Hurricane Gustav (2008)
- Hurricane Sandy (2012)
- Hurricane Melissa (2025)
