= McCook, Texas =

- Unincorporated community
- Location within Texas Location within the United States
- Coordinates: 26°29′01″N 98°23′27″W
- Country: United States
- State: Texas
- County: Hidalgo
- Elevation: 305 ft (93 m)
- Time zone: UTC-6 (Central (CST))
  - Summer (DST): UTC-5 (CDT)
- Area code: 956
- GNIS feature ID: 1341163

McCook is an unincorporated community in Hidalgo County, Texas, United States. The community is located on Farm to Market Road 681, 30 miles (48 km) northwest of McAllen.

== History ==
McCook was founded circa 1925. By 1936, the community had its own school district, post office, and church; for the next few decades, its population hovered near 40 residents. By 1964, the population had risen to 100. As of 2000, the population was 91; the residents were spread out over a rural area.
