= SS Nicaragua =

Coordinates: 26°41′34″N 97°19′06″W

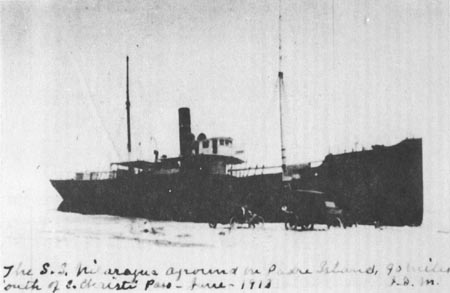
- The wreck of SS Nicaragua on Padre Island in June 1913.

History
- Name: SS Nicaragua
- Launched: 1891
- Fate: Wrecked 16 October 1912

General characteristics
- Tonnage: 611 GRT
- Length: 190 ft (58 m)

SS Nicaragua was a cargo ship that ran aground on Padre Island off the coast of Texas in the Gulf of Mexico in 1912.

Nicaragua was built in 1891 in Bergen, Norway, and her plans show that she was 190 feet (58 m) long overall. Lloyd's of London listed her at 611 gross register tons.

Carrying cotton and miscellaneous cargo, Nicaragua left Tampico, Mexico, on 11 October 1912 bound for Port Arthur, Texas. Five days later, on the evening of 16 October 1912 during a storm that sank vessels all over the Gulf of Mexico, Nicaragua suffered a broken rudder chain and was left adrift near the Devil's Elbow, a point of tidal convergence around milepost 50 from Malaquite Beach on Texas's Padre Island National Seashore. The Devil's Elbow was the site of a number of shipwrecks during the nineteenth and early twentieth centuries.

Rumors have arisen about gun running and other illegal activities Nicaragua may have performed, but there is no evidence that she was engaged in any illegal activities at the time she was wrecked.

Nicaragua′s stern, engine room section, and masthead remained visible off Padre Island for many years, serving as a landmark for down-island travelers. The remaining structure of Nicaragua still can be seen at low tide.
