= 1903 Jamaica hurricane =

Category 3 Atlantic hurricane in 1903

Hurricane Two 1903 Jamaica hurricane
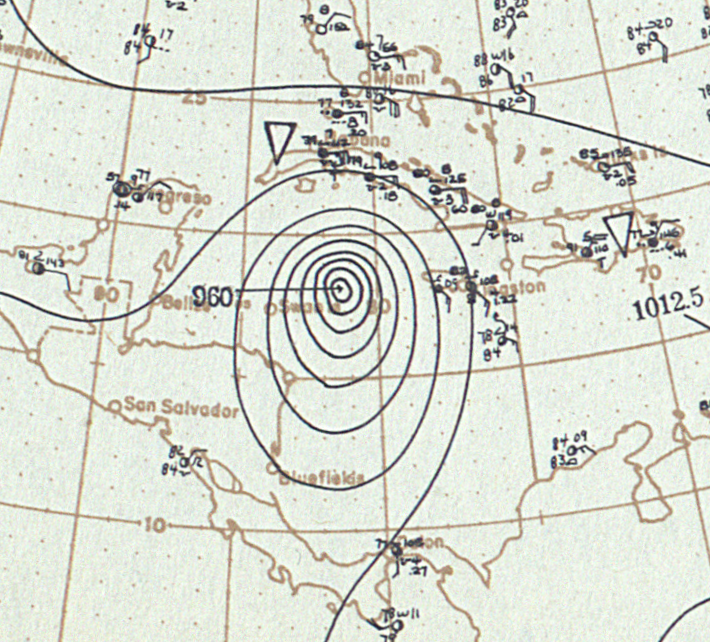
- Surface weather analysis of the hurricane near peak strength on August 12

Meteorological history
- Formed: August 6, 1903
- Dissipated: August 16, 1903

Category 3 major hurricane
- 1-minute sustained (SSHWS/NWS)
- Highest winds: 120 mph (195 km/h)
- Lowest pressure: 958 mbar (hPa); 28.29 inHg

Overall effects
- Fatalities: 149–188
- Damage: $10 million (1903 USD)
- Areas affected: Lesser Antilles, Greater Antilles, Mexico
- IBTrACS
- Part of the 1903 Atlantic hurricane season

The 1903 Jamaica hurricane devastated Martinique, Jamaica, and the Cayman Islands in August 1903. The second tropical cyclone of the season, the storm was first observed well east of the Windward Islands on August 6. The system moved generally west-northwestward and strengthened into a hurricane on August 7. It struck Martinique early on August 9, shortly before reaching the Caribbean. Later that day, the storm became a major hurricane. Early on August 11, it made landfall near Morant Point, Jamaica, with winds of 120 mph (195 km/h), with what would be the hurricane's maximum sustained wind speed. Early on the following day, the storm brushed Grand Cayman at the same intensity. The system weakened before landfall near Playa del Carmen, Quintana Roo, early on August 13, with winds of 100 mph (160 km/h). The system emerging into the Gulf of Mexico early on August 14 after weakening while crossing the Yucatán Peninsula, but failed to re-strengthen. Around 00:00 UTC on August 16, the cyclone made landfall north of Tampico, Tamaulipas, with winds of 80 mph (130 km/h). The hurricane soon weakened to a tropical storm and dissipated over San Luis Potosí late on August 16.

In Martinique, hundreds of homes were deroofed in Fort-de-France, while about 5,000 people were left homeless in the villages of Fond, Fourniols, La Haye, Recluce, and Tivoli, all of which were established after the eruption of Mount Pelée in 1902. The hurricane also left extensive damage to crops and eight fatalities. In Jamaica, several communities were completely or nearly destroyed, including Manchioneal, Port Antonio, and Port Maria. Thousands of homes also suffered damage in the capital city of Kingston. Banana crops were devastated so severely that many growers were forced into bankruptcy. Numerous ships were wrecked, particularly on the north coast of the island. There were at least 65 deaths and about $10 million (1903 USD) in damage. In the Cayman Islands, more than 200 houses and seven of eight churches on Grand Cayman were destroyed or heavily damaged. Of the 23 ships in the harbor, only the Governor Blake survived. Most of the crews on board those ships were reported killed, but loss of life onshore was minimal. The storm also caused heavy damage on the Yucatán Peninsula. Many ships were wrecked and communications were cut off in several places. In the Tampico area, there was considerable damage to the port and many ships were sunk or driven ashore. Much of the land between Tampico and Cárdenas in San Luis Potosí was submerged due to flooding. In all, the storm is believed to have killed at least 149 people.

== Meteorological history ==
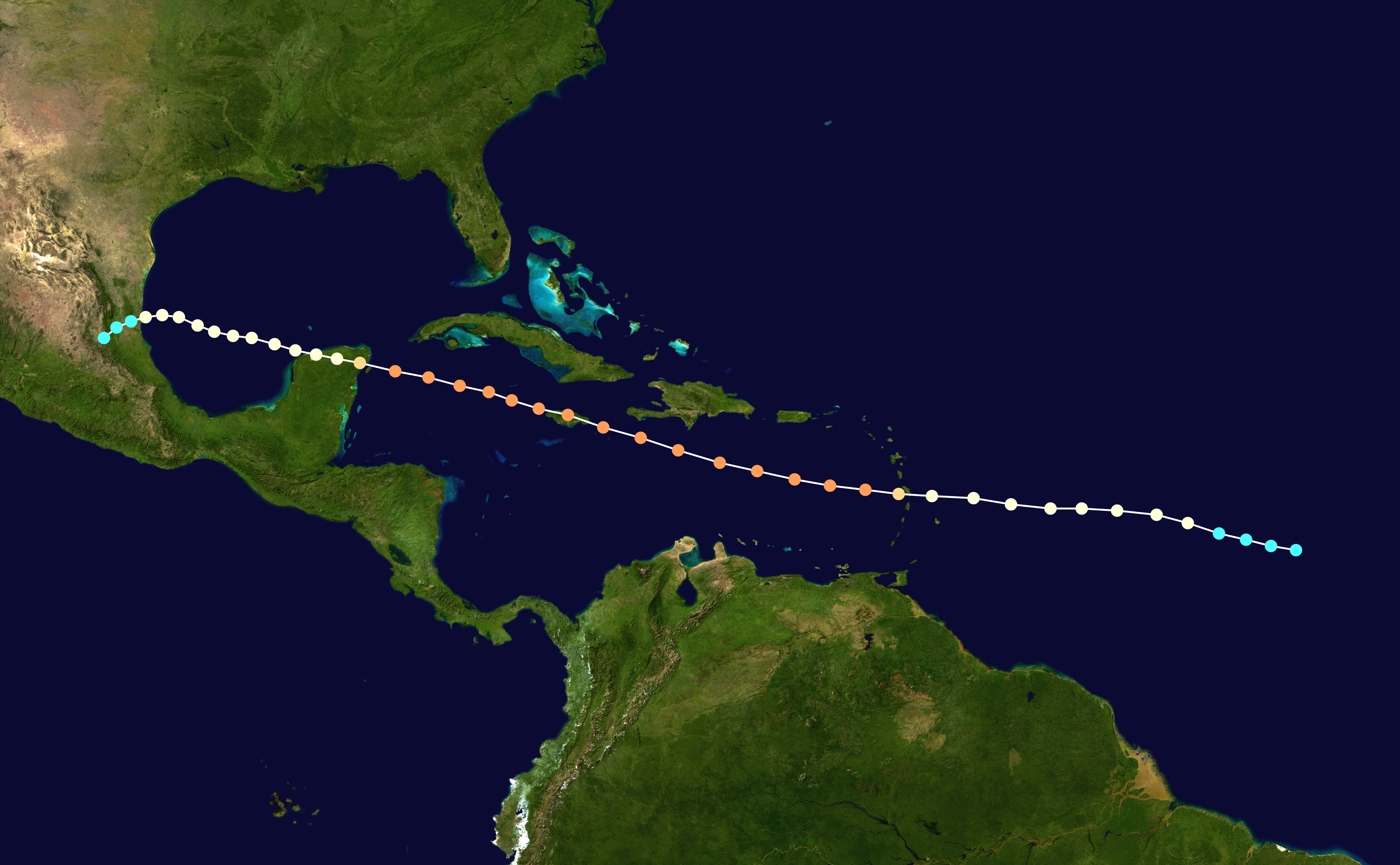
Map plotting the storm's track and intensity, according to the Saffir–Simpson scale Map key Saffir–Simpson scale Tropical depression (≤38 mph, ≤62 km/h) Tropical storm (39–73 mph, 63–118 km/h) Category 1 (74–95 mph, 119–153 km/h) Category 2 (96–110 mph, 154–177 km/h) Category 3 (111–129 mph, 178–208 km/h) Category 4 (130–156 mph, 209–251 km/h) Category 5 (≥157 mph, ≥252 km/h) Unknown Storm type Tropical cyclone Subtropical cyclone Extratropical cyclone, remnant low, tropical disturbance, or monsoon depression

A tropical storm was first observed by a ship about 835 mi (1,345 km) northeast of Cayenne, French Guiana, early on August 6, according to historic weather maps. However, the scarcity of observations means that its genesis may have occurred earlier than this time and been undetected operationally. With initial winds of 60 mph (95 km/h), the system moved generally west-northwestward and strengthened into Category 1 hurricane on the modern day Saffir–Simpson hurricane wind scale about 24 hours later. The first indication of the storm to the east of Barbados was on August 8 via telegraph reports. Early on August 9, the cyclone struck Martinique as either a strong Category 1 or a weak Category 2 hurricane. The storm entered the Caribbean shortly thereafter. Around 12:00 UTC, the cyclone intensified into a Category 3 hurricane, becoming the first major hurricane in the Atlantic basin since the second storm of 1900 and the first in the Caribbean since the 1899 San Ciriaco hurricane.

After 06:00 UTC on August 11, the cyclone struck Jamaica near Morant Point with winds of 120 mph (195 km/h). At 06:00 UTC on August 12, while brushing Grand Cayman, the hurricane peaked with maximum sustained winds of the same intensity and a minimum barometric pressure of 958 mbar (28.3 inHg), observed by the Governor Blake. The system weakened to a Category 2 around the time of landfall near Playa del Carmen, Quintana Roo, early on August 13, with winds of 100 mph (160 km/h). By 12:00 UTC, the storm further weakened to a Category 1, based on the Empirical Inland Wind Decay Model. After crossing the Yucatán Peninsula and emerging into the Gulf of Mexico early on August 14, the hurricane failed to re-strengthen. Around 00:00 UTC on August 16, it made landfall north of Tampico, Tamaulipas, with winds of 80 mph (130 km/h). The hurricane soon weakened to a tropical storm and dissipated over San Luis Potosí late on August 16.

== Impact ==
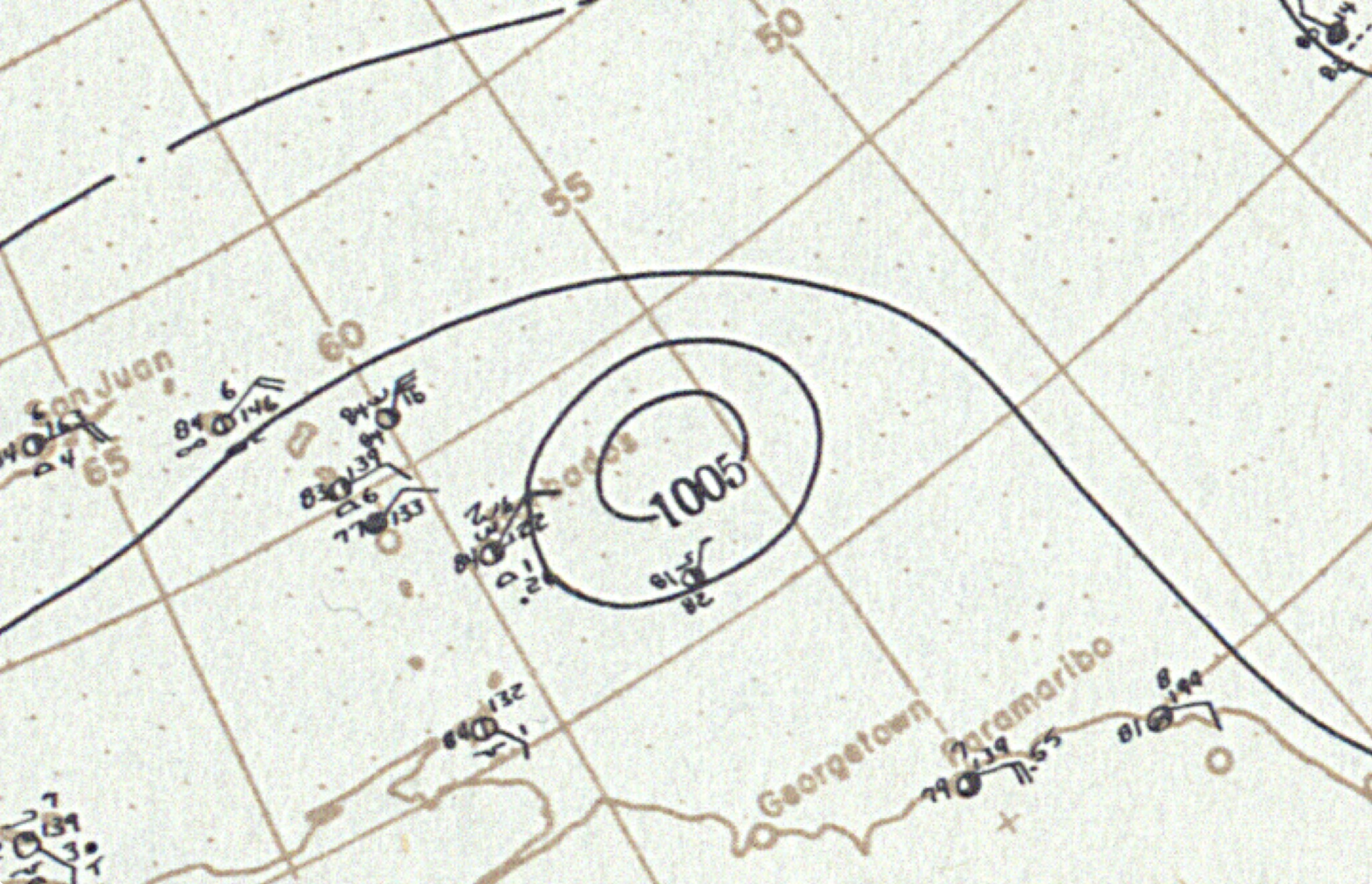
Weather map of the hurricane approaching the Leeward Islands on August 8

Telegraph reports of "a disturbance probably of dangerous strength" approaching Barbados from the east were sent to stations throughout the Lesser Antilles on August 8. Shipping interests in the Gulf of Mexico and in parts of the western Atlantic were alerted daily of the progress of the hurricane until August 14. Additionally, hurricane warnings were issued by the Weather Bureau for Florida and the Gulf Coast of the United States as the storm approached the western Caribbean, due to the possibility of the storm curving northward.

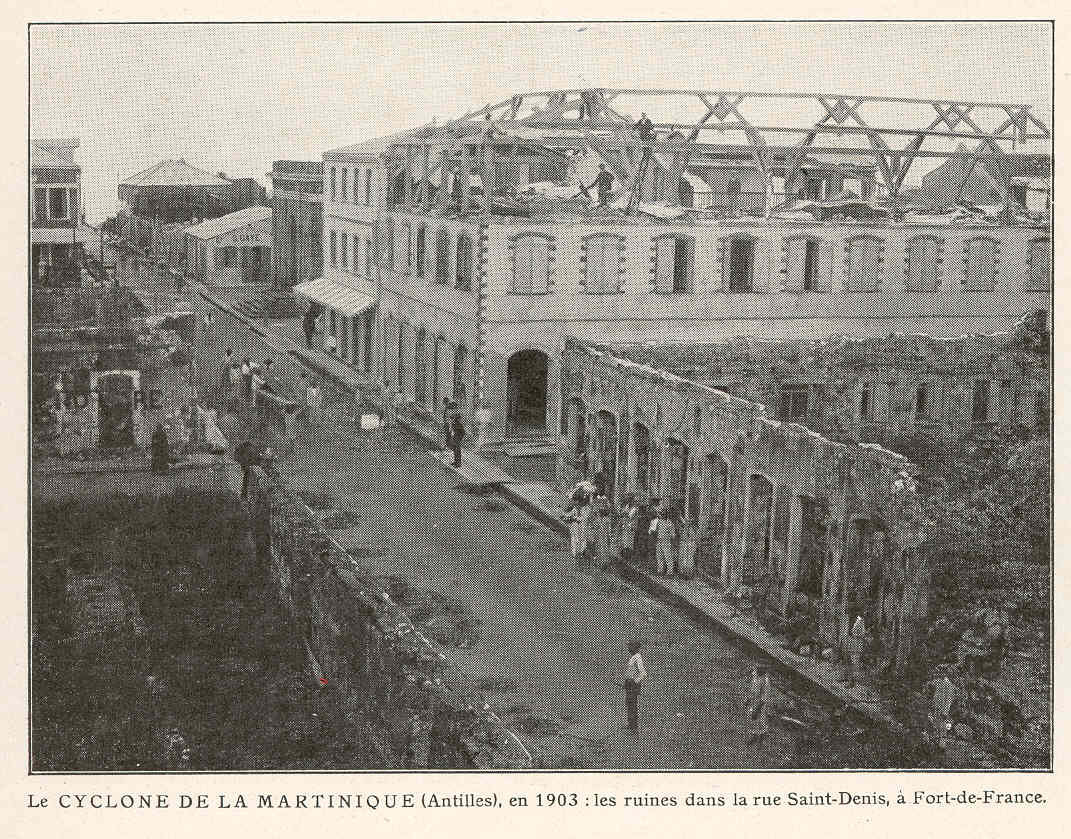
Damage in Fort-de-France, Martinique after the hurricane

In the Windward Islands, Martinique suffered the worst damage. At Fort-de-France, hundreds of homes were unroofed. Streets were covered in roof tiles and impassible due to uprooted trees, which tore up the roads. Several vessels were severely damaged. Additionally, the towns of La Trinité, Le Carbet, Le François, Saint-Joseph, and Sainte-Marie "suffered considerably". About 5,000 people were left homeless in the destroyed villages of Fond, Fourniols, La Haye, Recluce, and Tivoli, all established after the eruption of Mount Pelée in 1902. Throughout the island, there was extensive damage to crops. Eight deaths were reported, with one in Fort-de-France and seven in La Trinité.

The storms severely damaged crops on Dominica, particularly cocoa. After several years of increasing amounts of exported cocoa, there was a decrease of approximately 1.86% in pounds between 1902–03 and 1903–04. In Puerto Rico, there was high winds and heavy rainfall along the north coast of the island.

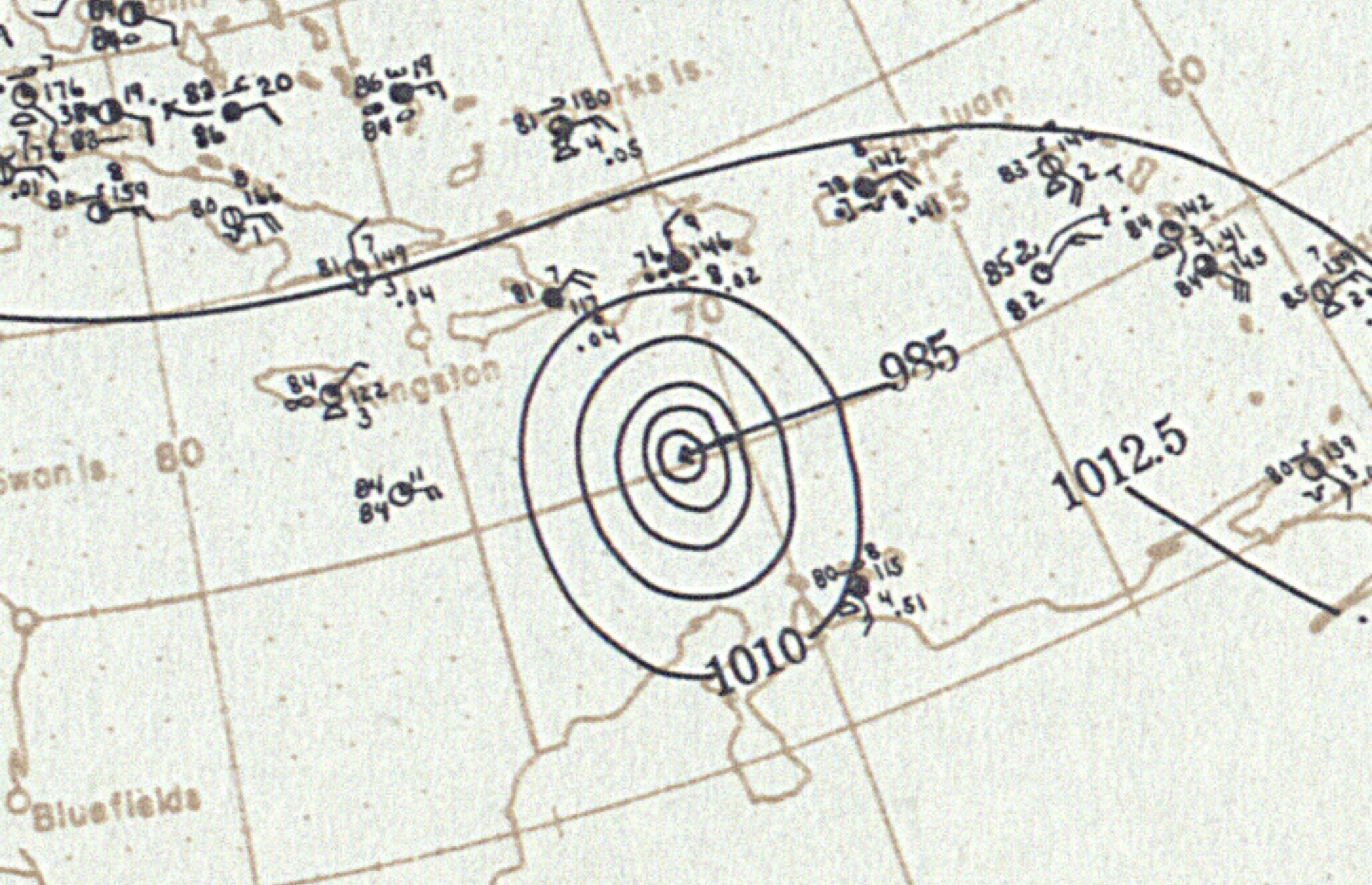
Weather map of the hurricane approaching Jamaica on August 10

The northern shore of Jamaica was devastated, with many ships being washed ashore. There was a storm surge about 20 ft (6.1 m) in height at Falmouth. This implies that the storm surge along Jamaica's northern coast may have reached that height. Numerous ships were also wrecked along the coast. Only six homes remained standing at Port Antonio. The hotel, offices, plantations, and wharves owned by the United Fruit Company were nearly destroyed. Additionally, the company's five vessels were beached, including the Alfred Dumois, Brighton, and Simon Dumois. In Port Maria, which was almost obliterated, "it was impossible to find where streets had been after the storm." Homes were destroyed in such a way that "how anyone escaped alive is a mystery." At Manchioneal, all but a few dwellings suffered destruction from the wind or were swept out to sea. The Norwegian steamship Salvatore di Giorgio was swept ashore at Annotto Bay. In the eastern portions of the island, entire villages were demolished, leaving thousands of peasants without shelter or food.

Thousands of homes were damaged in Kingston, while the electrical works building was deroofed, disabling the machinery. Local railroad traffic and streets cars stopped. Waves damaged wharves and capsized several vessels in the harbor. Some areas on the south side of the island were left completely devoid of crops. Although the western areas of Jamaica were not as devastated as other portions of the island, some banana plantations there were partially destroyed and there was a loss to orange and coffee crops. Throughout Jamaica, devastation to the banana crop was "complete", forcing many growers into bankruptcy. It was estimated that the fruit trade would be paralyzed for as much as a year. Damage reached $10 million and there were at least 65 deaths, while other reports indicate as many as 90 fatalities.

At the Cayman Islands, wind gusts reached as high as 110–120 mph (180–190 km/h). More than 200 houses and seven of eight churches on Grand Cayman were destroyed or heavily damaged. In George Town, a number of dwellings were destroyed. Of the 23 ships in the harbor, only the Governor Blake survived. Most of the crews on board those ships were reported killed but loss of life on shore was minimal. Throughout the islands, all trees and crops were destroyed. In Cuba, the hurricane knocked out telegraphic communications in the eastern portions of the island, but the connection to Santiago de Cuba was quickly restored. A number of dwellings were damaged there, some were deroofed, while other homes were reduced to fragments. Pieces of sheet iron also became airborne. East of the city, all small ports received impact from the storm. Cienfuegos was "ravaged by the storm", while extensive damage occurred in Cárdenas and Matanzas. In the outskirts of Havana, thatch houses were blown away. Farther west in Pinar del Río Province, some crops and small buildings were demolished.

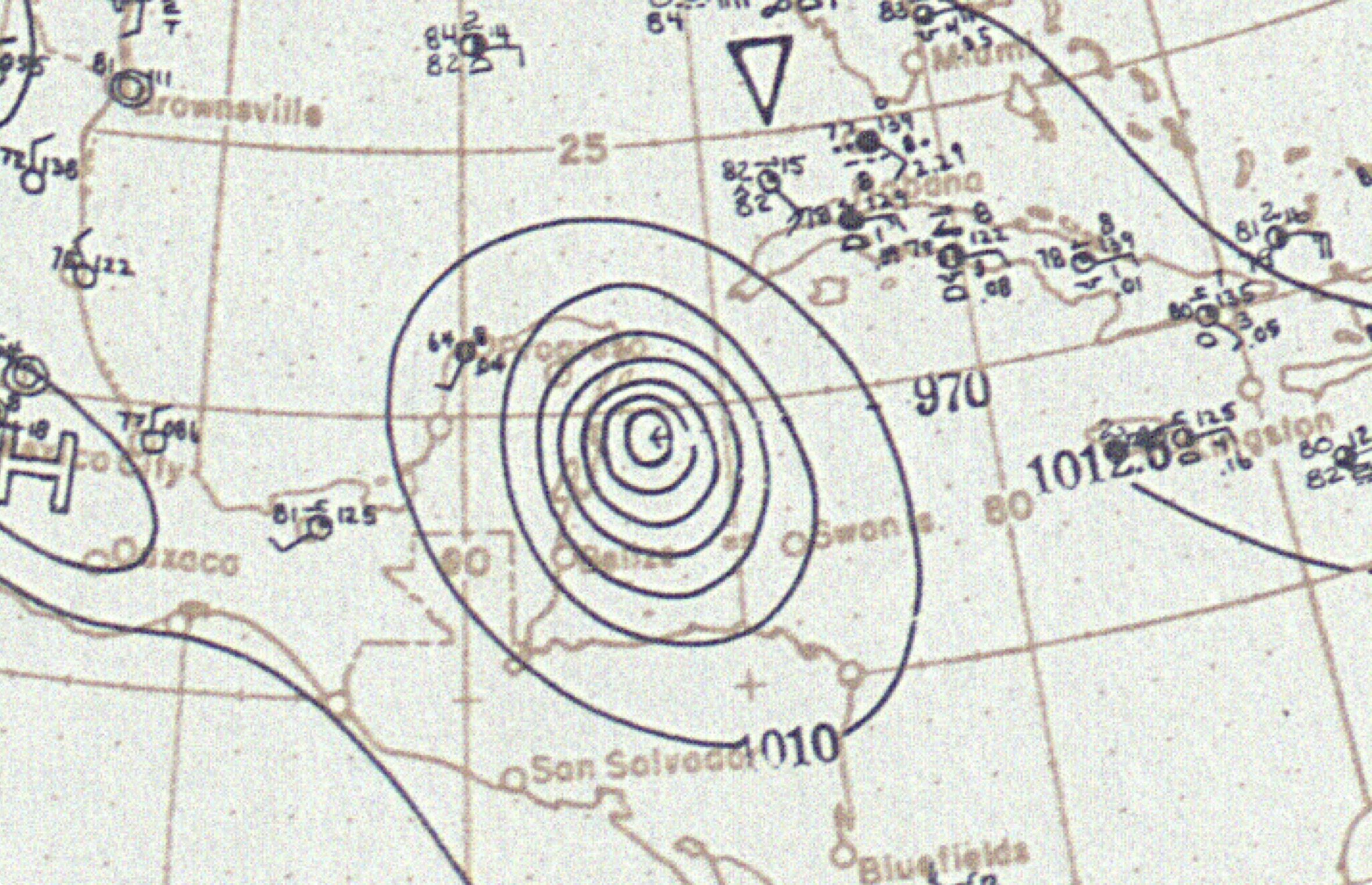
Surface weather map showing the hurricane approaching the Yucatán Peninsula on August 13

In the Gulf of Mexico, the British steamship Rosina encountered the hurricane. The storm damaged the pipes and smokestacks, ripped out the ventilator, and washed 30,000 oranges into the sea. Additionally, a Greek sailor was swept overboard and presumably drowned. The storm sunk or drove many ships ashore along the Yucatán Peninsula. Communications were disrupted in many areas after telegraph lines fell, while a number of roads were left impassible after trees toppled. In the Tampico area, there was considerable damage to the port and many ships being sunk or driven ashore. All of the bridges along Monterey and Mexican Gulf Railroad were destroyed. The roof at the general market was almost completely torn off. Many of the businesses suffered serious losses after rain subsequently poured in the building, with damage reaching at least $4,200 (10,000 pesos). The chamber of commerce building collapsed with people inside, though no injuries or deaths occurred. Much of the land between Tampico and Cárdenas in San Luis Potosí was submerged due to flooding. In Barra, a city in Tamaulipas, the hospital was nearly destroyed, as was the marketplace. In San Luis Potosí, the casino and restaurant in Tamasopo were demolished. Twenty bridges were destroyed in San Luis Potosí. Railroad traffic between San Luis Potosí and Monterrey, the capital of Nuevo León, was completely disrupted.

Overall, the storm is believed to have killed between 149 and 188 people.

== Aftermath ==
After the storm, thousands in Jamaica were left destitute, without food or shelter. Committees were formed in each parish affected to assess the damage, with Governor Augustus Hemming later visiting the areas of destruction. On September 17, the Parliament of Jamaica passed the Hurricane Loans Law, which provided low interest loans to planters impacted by the storm. The Secretary of State of Jamaica authorized just over $241,000 (50,000 £) to be used for the loans. A total of 2,983 people applied for a loan, 1,477 of whom were granted. During a meeting in Port Antonio, the citizens issued an appeal to Americans for aid, after receiving approval from Governor Hemming. Relief efforts originated both locally and from other British possessions via the West India Committee. The Daily Gleaner newspaper was credited for its efforts in obtaining considerable amounts of food and building materials. Trinidad, then a colony of the United Kingdom, donated almost $5,000 (£1,000).

== See also ==
- List of Category 3 Atlantic hurricanes
- Hurricane Gilbert (1988)
- Hurricane Dean (2007)
