= Annotto Bay =

- Town
- Location within Jamaica
- Coordinates: 18°16′13″N 76°46′14″W
- Country: Jamaica
- Parish: Saint Mary
- Elevation: 48 m (157 ft)

Population (1991)
  - Total: 5,468
  - Estimate (2010): 5,504
- Time zone: UTC-5 (EST)

Annotto Bay is a town in the parish of Saint Mary in Jamaica. It was once an active port on the north side. This town was previously named ‘Guayguata’ by the Tainos, it is named from the abundance of the Annatto trees in the area. The Spanish settlement of the Mellila mentioned early in the sixteenth century Spanish Jamaica was probably located near present-day Annotto Bay and Fort George, Jamaica, and the nearby golf course are thought to have been built on a Spanish foundation.
