= List of Category 3 Atlantic hurricanes =

Hurricane Isaias approaching the Florida Panhandle at peak intensity on October 9, 2026. It is currently the most recent Atlantic hurricane to peak at Category 3 strength.

Within the North Atlantic Ocean, a Category 3 hurricane is a tropical cyclone that has reached 1-minute sustained wind speeds of between 96–112 knots (110–129 mph; 178–207 km/h; 49–58 m/s). Since the beginning of the Atlantic hurricane database in 1851, 162 tropical cyclones peaked at Category 3 strength on the Saffir–Simpson scale in the Atlantic basin, which covers the waters of the Atlantic Ocean north of the equator, the Caribbean Sea, and the Gulf of Mexico. This list does not include hurricanes that intensified further to a Category 4 or 5, the latter being the highest ranking on the scale.

Collectively, Category 3 Atlantic hurricanes caused nearly $100 billion in damage. Most of the damage total was caused by Hurricane Sandy in 2012, which left $68.7 billion in damage when it struck New Jersey as a post-tropical cyclone, and which was briefly a major hurricane near Cuba.

The known Category 3 hurricanes cumulatively killed 18,361 people, including 7,469 in the 2nd half of the 19th century, 7,541 in the 20th century, and 3,351 so far in the 21st century. Four hurricanes accounted for more than half of the recorded deaths. In 1870, a hurricane killed 1,200 people in Cuba. The 1893 Sea Islands hurricane left over 1,000 casualties when it struck the U.S. state of Georgia. In 1909, a hurricane killed about 4,000 people when it moved ashore northeast Mexico. More recently, Hurricane Jeanne in 2004 killed more than 3,000 people when it moved near Haiti.

== Background ==
In 1972, the National Hurricane Center (NHC) began ranking hurricanes according to wind speed with the Saffir–Simpson scale. A Category 3 has maximum sustained winds between 96 knots (110 mph; 178 km/h; 49 m/s) and 112 knots (129 mph; 207 km/h; 58 m/s). The NHC considers these winds to be sustained for a one-minute period at 10 metres (32.8 ft) above the ground. These winds are estimated using a blend of data from different sources, including observations from nearby ships, reconnaissance aircraft, automatic weather stations, and images from various satellites.

Landfalling storms of Category 3 intensity can cause significant structural damage. The winds are strong enough to knock down trees, blow out windows, destroy roofs, and cause lengthy power outages. Such storms pose a risk of injury or death to humans and animals in the storm path.

== Systems ==
=== 1850s through 1890s ===
Name	Duration	Peak intensity		Areas affected	Damage (USD)	Deaths	Refs
Name	Duration	Wind speed	Pressure	Areas affected	Damage (USD)	Deaths	Refs
San Agapito	August 16 - 28, 1851	115 mph (185 km/h)	Not Specified	The Caribbean, Florida	Unknown	Many	
One	August 19 - 30, 1852	115 mph (185 km/h)	961 hPa (28.38 inHg)	Southeastern United States	Unknown	300	
Four	September 8 - 10, 1853	115 mph (185 km/h)	Not Specified	None	None	None	
Three	September 2 - 12, 1854	125 mph (205 km/h)	938 hPa (27.70 inHg)	Southeastern United States	Unknown	≥26	
Five	September 15–16, 1855	125 mph (205 km/h)	950 hPa (28.05 inHg)	Louisiana, Mississippi			
Five	August 30, 1856	115 mph (185 km/h)	969 hPa (28.61 inHg)	Bahamas, Cuba, Florida	4		
Six	October 4 - 6, 1859	125 mph (205 km/h)	938 hPa (27.70 inHg)	Cuba, Bahamas	At least 2		
San Narciso	October 29, 1867	125 mph (205 km/h)	952 hPa (28.11 inHg)	Lesser Antilles, Puerto Rico	811		
New England	September 8, 1869	115 mph (185 km/h)	950 hPa (28.05 inHg)	New England	$50,000		
Unnamed	September 10–12, 1870	125 mph (205 km/h)	948 hPa (27.99 inHg)	Bermuda			
San Marcos	October 7, 1870	115 mph (185 km/h)	959 hPa (28.32 inHg)	Cuba, Florida Keys	1,200		
Unnamed	August 15–17, 1871	115 mph (185 km/h)	952 hPa (28.11 inHg)	Bahamas, Florida			
Santa Juana	August 21–2, 1871	115 mph (185 km/h)	962 hPa (28.41 inHg)	Lesser Antilles, Puerto Rico, Bahamas, Florida	27		
Nova Scotia	August 23–24, 1873	115 mph (185 km/h)	962 hPa (28.41 inHg)	Atlantic Canada	600		
Central Florida	September 28–October 7, 1873 †	115 mph (185 km/h)	959 hPa (28.32 inHg)	Haiti, Cuba, Florida	26		
Indianola	September 16, 1875	115 mph (185 km/h)	955 hPa (28.20 inHg)	Lesser Antilles, Greater Antilles, Texas	829		
San Felipe	September 13, 1876	115 mph (185 km/h)	<980 hPa (28.94 inHg)	Lesser Antilles, Greater Antilles, East Coast of the United States	21		
Unnamed	October 19, 1876	115 mph (185 km/h)	958 hPa (28.29 inHg)	Cuba, Florida			
Unnamed	October 3, 1877	115 mph (185 km/h)	960 hPa (28.35 inHg)	Curacao, East Coast of the United States			
Unnamed	October 17–19, 1878	115 mph (185 km/h)	951 hPa (28.08 inHg)	No land areas			
Unnamed	August 18, 1879	115 mph (185 km/h)	971 hPa (28.67 inHg)	East Coast of the United States	46		
Unnamed	August 31–September 1, 1879	125 mph (205 km/h)	950 hPa (28.05 inHg)	Louisiana	1		
Unnamed	September 9–10, 1882	125 mph (205 km/h)	949 hPa (28.02 inHg)	Bahamas, Cuba, Florida	$400,000	.	
Unnamed	August 28–29, 1883	125 mph (205 km/h)	948 hPa (27.99 inHg)	Bermuda, Atlantic Canada			
Unnamed	September 4–6, 1883	125 mph (205 km/h)	955 hPa (28.20 inHg)	Caribbean, Bahamas, North Carolina	106		
Unnamed	September 7–8, 1884	125 mph (205 km/h)	957 hPa (28.26 inHg)	No land areas			
Unnamed	August 21–22, 1886	120 mph (195 km/h)	977 hPa (28.85 inHg)	Caribbean, Bahamas	4		
Unnamed	August 21–22, 1886	115 mph (185 km/h)	962 hPa (28.41 inHg)	Atlantic Canada			
Unnamed	October 11–22, 1886	120 mph (195 km/h)	955 hPa (28.20 inHg)	Cuba, Louisiana, Texas	150		
Unnamed	August 19–21, 1887	120 mph (195 km/h)	967 hPa (28.56 inHg)	Florida			
Unnamed	August 22–26, 1887	120 mph (195 km/h)	967 hPa (28.56 inHg)	Cuba, Bahamas			
Unnamed	August 16, 1888	125 mph (205 km/h)	967 hPa (28.56 inHg)	Southeastern United States			
Unnamed	September 3–4, 1888	125 mph (205 km/h)	972 hPa (28.70 inHg)	Turks and Caicos, Cuba, Mexico	921		
Unnamed	August 27–29, 1890	120 mph (195 km/h)	965 hPa (28.50 inHg)	Newfoundland	10		
San Magín	August 18–19, 1891	125 mph (205 km/h)	961 hPa (28.38 inHg)	Martinique, Puerto Rico, Turks and Caicos, Florida	703	$10 million	
San Roque	August 16–20, 1893 †	120 mph (195 km/h)	986 hPa (29.12 inHg)	Lesser Antilles, Puerto Rico, Atlantic Canada	4		
Midnight Storm	August 22–23, 1893 †	115 mph (185 km/h)	952 hPa (28.11 inHg)	New York, New England	34		
Sea Islands	August 23–28, 1893	120 mph (195 km/h)	954 hPa (28.17 inHg)	Bahamas, Southeastern United States	1,000		
Unnamed	October 2–13, 1893	120 mph (195 km/h)	955 hPa (28.20 inHg)	Bahamas, Southeastern United States	28		
Unnamed	September 6–8, 1894	115 mph (185 km/h)	948 hPa (27.99 inHg)	No land areas	1		
Unnamed	September 20–22, 1894	120 mph (195 km/h)	985 hPa (29.09 inHg)	Lesser Antilles, Hispaniola, Cuba, southeastern United States	200	$1 million	
Unnamed	October 6–9, 1894	120 mph (195 km/h)	955 hPa (28.20 inHg)	Southeastern United States, northeastern United States			
San Ramón	September 5–9, 1896	115 mph (185 km/h)	956 hPa (28.23 inHg)	Caribbean, New England			
Cedar Keys	September 27–29, 1896	125 mph (205 km/h)	960 hPa (28.35 inHg)	Southeastern United States	202	$9.6 million	
Unnamed	September 5–9, 1896	115 mph (185 km/h)	956 hPa (28.23 inHg)	Caribbean, Bermuda, Atlantic Canada	17		

=== 1900s through 1940s ===
Name	Duration	Peak intensity		Areas affected	Damage (USD)	Deaths	Refs
Name	Duration	Wind speed	Pressure	Areas affected	Damage (USD)	Deaths	Refs
Two	September 7 - 19, 1900	120 mph (195 km/h)	Not Specified	None	None	None	
Two	August 9 - 13, 1903	120 mph (195 km/h)	958 hPa (28.29 inHg)	Lesser Antilles, Jamaica, Mexico	$10 million	149	
Unnamed	October 9 - 10, 1905	120 mph (195 km/h)	945 hPa (27.91 inHg)	Greater Antilles, Bermuda, Atlantic Canada	Unknown	5	
Unnamed	September 25–27, 1906	120 mph (195 km/h)	953 hPa (28.14 inHg)	Gulf Coast of the United States	134	$19.2 million	
Unnamed	October 10–18, 1906 †	120 mph (195 km/h)	953 hPa (28.14 inHg)	Central America, Cuba, Florida	240	$4.1 million	
Unnamed	September 12–15, 1908	120 mph (195 km/h)	Not Specified	Caribbean, Turks and Caicos, Bahamas	19		
Unnamed	July 13 21, 1909	115 mph (185 km/h)	959 hPa (28.32 inHg)	Cuba, Texas	$2 million	41	
Six	August 20 - 28, 1909	120 mph (195 km/h)	Not Specified	The Caribbean, Mexico	$50 million	4,000	
Nine	September 13 - 22, 1909	120 mph (195 km/h)	952 hPa (28.11 inHg)	Greater Antiles, Louisiana, Arkansas	$50 million	400	
Eleven	October 6 - 13, 1909	120 mph (195 km/h)	957 hPa (28.26 inHg)	Cuba, Florida, The Bahamas	$1 million	34	
Seven	November 11 - 21, 1912	115 mph (185 km/h)	965 hPa (28.50 inHg)	Jamaica	$1.5 million	100−200	
Three	August 27 - September 11, 1915	120 mph (195 km/h)	Not Specified	Bermuda		1	
Two	June 28 - July 10, 1916	120 mph (195 km/h)	950 hPa (28.05 inHg)	United States Gulf Coast		>34	
Four	July 11 - 15, 1916	115 mph (185 km/h)	960 hPa (28.35 inHg)	Carolinas		26	
Eleven	September 17 - 25, 1916	120 mph (195 km/h)	Not Specified	Bermuda			
Thirteen	October 6 - 13, 1916	120 mph (195 km/h)	963 hPa (28.44 inHg)	Lesser Antiles			
Three	August 30 - September 7, 1917	120 mph (195 km/h)	Not Specified	Bermuda			
One	August 1 - August 7, 1918	120 mph (195 km/h)	955 hPa (28.20 inHg)	Louisiana	$5 million	34	
San Pedro	September 9–15, 1921	125 mph (205 km/h)	961 hPa (28.38 inHg)	Windward Islands, Greater Antilles	80		
Unnamed	September 16–22, 1922 †	120 mph (195 km/h)	960 hPa (28.35 inHg)	Leeward Islands, Bermuda			
Unnamed	September 29–30, 1923	120 mph (195 km/h)	960 hPa (28.35 inHg)	Bahamas, Newfoundland			
Unnamed	August 22–24, 1924	120 mph (195 km/h)	960 hPa (28.35 inHg)	Puerto Rico, East Coast of the United States	2		
Unnamed	August 2–6, 1926	120 mph (195 km/h)	968 hPa (28.59 inHg)	Bermuda, Atlantic Canada	55		
Unnamed	August 25, 1926	115 mph (185 km/h)	955 hPa (28.20 inHg)	Louisiana	25	$6 million	
Unnamed	August 21–24, 1927	125 mph (205 km/h)	950 hPa (28.05 inHg)	East Coast of the United States, Atlantic Canada	175	$1.6 million	
Unnamed	August 25–27, 1930	125 mph (205 km/h)	960 hPa (28.35 inHg)	Bermuda			
Unnamed	October 5–6, 1933	125 mph (205 km/h)	958 hPa (28.29 inHg)	Jamaica, Cuba, Florida, Bahamas, Atlantic Canada	10	$1 million	
Unnamed	November 23–24, 1934	115 mph (185 km/h)	955 hPa (28.20 inHg)	Bermuda			
Unnamed	September 15–17, 1936	120 mph (195 km/h)	962 hPa (28.41 inHg)	East Coast of the United States	2	$255,000	
Unnamed	August 15–17, 1937	125 mph (205 km/h)	951 hPa (28.08 inHg)	No land areas			
Unnamed	August 25–26, 1938	120 mph (195 km/h)	964 hPa (28.47 inHg)	Mexico			
Unnamed	September 23, 1941	125 mph (205 km/h)	942 hPa (27.82 inHg)	Central United States, Canada	7	$6 million	
Unnamed	October 5, 1941	120 mph (195 km/h)	962 hPa (28.41 inHg)	Bahamas, Southeastern United States	10	$675,000	
Unnamed	August 29–30, 1942	115 mph (185 km/h)	950 hPa (28.05 inHg)	Mexico, Texas	8	$26.5 million	
Unnamed	September 3–5, 1943	120 mph (195 km/h)		Bermuda, Atlantic Canada			
Unnamed	August 19–20, 1944	120 mph (195 km/h)	963 hPa (28.44 inHg)	Windward Islands, Jamaica, Mexico	216		
Unnamed	August 26–27, 1945	115 mph (185 km/h)	963 hPa (28.44 inHg)	Texas	3	$20.1 million	
Love	October 19–20, 1947	120 mph (195 km/h)	961 hPa (28.38 inHg)	Bermuda			
Able	August 28–29, 1948	120 mph (195 km/h)	983 hPa (29.03 inHg)	East Coast of the United States, Atlantic Canada		$989,000	
Fox	October 5, 1948	125 mph (205 km/h)	971 hPa (28.67 inHg)	Cuba, Florida, Bahamas, Bermuda	11	$12.5 million	
Unnamed	September 6–10, 1949	125 mph (205 km/h)	974 hPa (28.76 inHg)	Bermuda, Newfoundland			

=== 1950s through 1990s ===
Name	Duration	Peak intensity		Areas affected	Damage (USD)	Deaths	Refs
Name	Duration	Wind speed	Pressure	Areas affected	Damage (USD)	Deaths	Refs
Able	August 17–20, 1950	115 mph (185 km/h)	978 hPa (28.88 inHg)	East Coast of the United States, Atlantic Canada	11	$1 million	
Easy	September 5, 1950	120 mph (195 km/h)	958 hPa (28.29 inHg)	Cuba, Florida	2	$3.3 million	
Jig	October 15, 1950	115 mph (185 km/h)	987 hPa (29.15 inHg)	No land areas			
Fox	September 7–8, 1951	115 mph (185 km/h)	978 hPa (28.88 inHg)	No land areas			
Charlie	September 26–27, 1952	120 mph (195 km/h)	980 hPa (28.94 inHg)	Puerto Rico, Bermuda	4	$1 million	
Edna	September 17–18, 1953	115 mph (185 km/h)	962 hPa (28.41 inHg)	Bermuda			
Florence	September 25, 1953	115 mph (185 km/h)	968 hPa (28.59 inHg)	Gulf Coast of the United States		$200,000	
Carol	August 31, 1954	115 mph (185 km/h)	955 hPa (28.20 inHg)	East Coast of the United States, Atlantic Canada	$462 million		
Edna	September 9–11, 1954	125 mph (205 km/h)	943 hPa (27.85 inHg)	New England, Atlantic Canada	27	$42.8 million	
Hilda	September 15–19, 1955 †	120 mph (195 km/h)	952 hPa (28.11 inHg)	Cuba, Mexico	304	$120 million	
Betsy	August 13–17, 1956 †	120 mph (195 km/h)	959 hPa (28.32 inHg)	Leeward Islands, Puerto Rico, Bahamas	$50 million		
Audrey	June 27, 1957	125 mph (205 km/h)	946 hPa (27.94 inHg)	Gulf Coast of the United States, Canada	431	$150 million	
Hannah	September 30–October 2, 1959	120 mph (195 km/h)	959 hPa (28.32 inHg)	Azores			
Ethel	September 14–15, 1960	115 mph (185 km/h)	974 hPa (28.76 inHg)	Gulf Coast of the United States	1	$1.06 million	
Arlene	August 9–10, 1963	115 mph (185 km/h)	969 hPa (28.61 inHg)	Leeward Islands, Bermuda			
Beulah	August 24, 1963	120 mph (195 km/h)	958 hPa (28.29 inHg)	No land areas			
Isbell	October 14–15, 1964	115 mph (185 km/h)	964 hPa (28.47 inHg)	Cuba, East Coast of the United States	7	$30 million	
Alma	June 8–9, 1966	125 mph (205 km/h)	970 hPa (28.64 inHg)	Central America, Cuba, East Coast of the United States	93	$210 million	
Faith	August 28–29, 1966	120 mph (195 km/h)	950 hPa (28.05 inHg)	Atlantic Canada, Northern Europe	5		
Debbie	August 18–23, 1969 †	120 mph (195 km/h)	951 hPa (28.08 inHg)	Atlantic Canada			
Gerda	September 9, 1969	125 mph (205 km/h)	979 hPa (28.91 inHg)	East Coast of the United States, Atlantic Canada		$3.5 million	
Inga	October 5, 1969	115 mph (185 km/h)	964 hPa (28.47 inHg)	Bermuda			
Ella	September 12, 1970	125 mph (205 km/h)	967 hPa (28.56 inHg)	Cuba, Florida, Texas	1		
Ellen	September 22, 1973	115 mph (185 km/h)	962 hPa (28.41 inHg)	No land areas			
Becky	August 30–31, 1974	115 mph (185 km/h)	977 hPa (28.85 inHg)	No land areas			
Caroline	August 31, 1975	115 mph (185 km/h)	963 hPa (28.44 inHg)	Turks and Caicos, Cuba, Mexico	2		
Eloise	September 23, 1975	125 mph (205 km/h)	955 hPa (28.20 inHg)	Lesser Antilles, Greater Antilles, Yucatán Peninsula, Gulf Coast of the United States, eastern United States	80	$550 million	
Belle	August 8–9, 1976	120 mph (195 km/h)	957 hPa (28.26 inHg)	East Coast of the United States	$100 million		
Frances	September 1, 1976	115 mph (185 km/h)	963 hPa (28.44 inHg)	No land areas			
Frances	September 9, 1980	115 mph (185 km/h)	958 hPa (28.29 inHg)	Cape Verde			
Floyd	September 7, 1981	115 mph (185 km/h)	975 hPa (28.79 inHg)	Lesser Antilles, Bermuda			
Irene	September 28–29, 1981	120 mph (195 km/h)	959 hPa (28.32 inHg)	No land areas			
Alicia	August 18, 1983	115 mph (185 km/h)	962 hPa (28.41 inHg)	Texas	21	$3 billion	
Elena	September 1-2, 1985	125 mph (205 km/h)	953 hPa (28.14 inHg)	Cuba, Mississippi	9	$1.3 billion	
Kate	November 20–21, 1985	120 mph (195 km/h)	954 hPa (28.17 inHg)	Cuba, Florida	15	$70 million	
Emily	September 22–23, 1987	125 mph (205 km/h)	958 hPa (28.29 inHg)	Lesser Antilles, Greater Antilles, Bermuda, Bahamas	3	$80.3 million	
Gustav	August 31, 1990	120 mph (195 km/h)	956 hPa (28.23 inHg)	No Land Areas	0	Minimal	
Bob	August 19, 1991	115 mph (185 km/h)	950 hPa (28.05 inHg)	East Coast of the United States, Nova Scotia	17	$1.5 billion	
Emily	August 31-September 1, 1993	115 mph (185 km/h)	960 hPa (28.35 inHg)	North Carolina	3	$35 million	
Marilyn	September 16–17, 1995	115 mph (185 km/h)	949 hPa (28.02 inHg)	United States Virgin Islands, Puerto Rico, Dominica, Martinique, Guadeloupe	$2.5 billion		
Roxanne	October 10–11, 1995	115 mph (185 km/h)	956 hPa (28.23 inHg)	Yucatán Peninsula, Veracruz, Tabasco	29	$1.5 billion	
Bertha	July 9, 1996	115 mph (185 km/h)	960 hPa (28.35 inHg)	Northeastern Caribbean, Florida, North Carolina	$335 million		
Fran	September 4–6, 1996	120 mph (195 km/h)	946 hPa (27.94 inHg)	North Carolina, South Carolina, Virginia, West Virginia, Pennsylvania	27	$5 billion	
Isidore	September 28, 1996	115 mph (185 km/h)	960 hPa (28.35 inHg)	No land areas	0	None	
Lili	October 19, 1996	115 mph (185 km/h)	960 hPa (28.35 inHg)	Central America, Cuba, Florida, Bahamas, Bermuda, Ireland, Great Britain	22	$662 million	
Erika	September 8–10, 1997	125 mph (205 km/h)	946 hPa (27.94 inHg)	Leeward Islands, Puerto Rico, Azores	2	$10 million	
Bonnie	August 23–26, 1998	115 mph (185 km/h)	955 hPa (28.20 inHg)	Leeward Islands, North Carolina, Mid-Atlantic States	5	$1 billion	

=== 2000s through 2020s ===
Name	Duration	Peak intensity		Areas affected	Damage (USD)	Deaths	Refs
Name	Duration	Wind speed	Pressure	Areas affected	Damage (USD)	Deaths	Refs
Alberto	August 12–13, 2000	125 mph (205 km/h)	950 hPa (28.05 inHg)	No land areas	None	None	
Erin	September 9–10, 2001	120 mph (195 km/h)	968 hPa (28.59 inHg)	Bermuda, Newfoundland, East Coast of the United States	Minimal	None	
Felix	September 14, 2001	115 mph (185 km/h)	962 hPa (28.41 inHg)	Azores	None	None	
Isidore	September 21–23, 2002	125 mph (205 km/h)	934 hPa (27.58 inHg)	Windward Islands, Southeast Mexico, Louisiana	$1.28 billion	22	
Kate	October 3–5, 2003	125 mph (205 km/h)	952 hPa (28.11 inHg)	Newfoundland	None	None	
Alex	August 5, 2004	120 mph (195 km/h)	957 hPa (28.26 inHg)	North Carolina	$7.5 million	1	
Jeanne	September 25–26, 2004	120 mph (195 km/h)	950 hPa (28.05 inHg)	Guadeloupe, Hispaniola, Bahamas, Florida	$7.3 billion	3,037	
Maria	September 6, 2005	115 mph (185 km/h)	962 hPa (28.41 inHg)	East Coast of the United States, Norway	$3.1 million	3	
Beta	October 30, 2005	115 mph (185 km/h)	962 hPa (28.41 inHg)	Central America	$15.5 million	9	
Gordon	September 14–15, 2006	120 mph (195 km/h)	955 hPa (28.20 inHg)	Azores, Iberian Peninsula, British Isles	$3.8 million	None	
Helene	September 8, 2006	120 mph (195 km/h)	955 hPa (28.20 inHg)	British Isles	None	None	
Bertha	July 7–8, 2008	125 mph (205 km/h)	952 hPa (28.11 inHg)	Bermuda, East Coast of the United States	Minimal	3	
Fred	September 9–10, 2009	120 mph (195 km/h)	958 hPa (28.29 inHg)	Cape Verde Islands	None	None	
Karl	September 17, 2010	125 mph (205 km/h)	956 hPa (28.23 inHg)	Belize, Yucatán Peninsula, Veracruz	$3.9 billion	22	
Irene	August 24, 2011	120 mph (195 km/h)	942 hPa (27.82 inHg)	Antilles, Bahamas, North Carolina, New Jersey, New York, Eastern Canada	$14.2 billion	58	
Rina	October 25–26, 2011	115 mph (185 km/h)	966 hPa (28.53 inHg)	Central America, Florida	$2.3 million	None	
Michael	September 6, 2012	115 mph (185 km/h)	964 hPa (28.47 inHg)	No land areas	None	None	
Sandy	October 24, 2012	115 mph (185 km/h)	940 hPa (27.76 inHg)	Greater Antilles, Bahamas, United States East Coast	$68.7 billion	233	
Edouard	September 16, 2014	120 mph (195 km/h)	960 hPa (28.35 inHg)	East Coast of the United States	Minimal	2	
Danny	August 21, 2015	125 mph (205 km/h)	960 hPa (28.35 inHg)	Lesser Antilles	Minimal	None	
Gaston	August 28–31, 2016 †	115 mph (185 km/h)	962 hPa (28.41 inHg)	Azores	None	None	
Otto	November 24, 2016	115 mph (185 km/h)	975 hPa (28.79 inHg)	Nicaragua, Costa Rica, Panama	$192 million	23	
Lee	September 27, 2017	115 mph (185 km/h)	962 hPa (28.41 inHg)	No land areas	None	None	
Ophelia	October 14, 2017	115 mph (185 km/h)	959 hPa (28.32 inHg)	Azores, Portugal, Spain, Ireland, United Kingdom	$87.7 million	3	
Humberto	September 17–19, 2019	125 mph (205 km/h)	950 hPa (28.05 inHg)	Dominican Republic, Haiti, Cuba, The Bahamas, Florida, Bermuda	$25 million	2	
Epsilon	October 21–22, 2020	115 mph (185 km/h)	952 hPa (28.11 inHg)	Bermuda	Minimal	1	
Zeta	October 28, 2020	115 mph (185 km/h)	970 hPa (28.64 inHg)	Cayman Islands, Jamaica, Central America, Yucatán Peninsula, Gulf Coast of the United States, Southeastern United States, Mid-Atlantic, New England	$4.4 billion	9	
Grace	August 20, 2021	120 mph (195 km/h)	967 hPa (28.56 inHg)	Lesser Antilles, Greater Antilles, Yucatán Peninsula, Central Mexico	$513 million	16	
Larry	September 4–8, 2021	125 mph (205 km/h)	955 hPa (28.20 inHg)	Bermuda, Newfoundland	$80 million	5	
Rafael	November 6–8, 2024 †	120 mph (195 km/h)	956 hPa (28.23 inHg)	Panama, Costa Rica, Nicaragua, Colombia, Jamaica, Cayman Islands, Cuba	>$1.35 billion	8	
Isaias	October 9, 2026	120 mph (195 km/h)	958 hPa (28.29 inHg)	Gulf Coast of Mexico, Gulf Coast of the United States	Unknown	9	
Overall reference for name, dates, duration, winds, pressure, and location:

=== Other systems ===
Data analysed by Michael Chenoweth, a climate researcher, suggests that several other hurricanes prior to 1900 also peaked as Category 3 major hurricanes.

Chenoweth has suggested that the following systems were Category 3 hurricanes on the Saffir-Simpson hurricane wind scale:

Name	Duration	Peak intensity		Areas affected	Damage (USD)	Deaths	Refs
Name	Duration	Wind speed	Pressure	Areas affected	Damage (USD)	Deaths	Refs
Three	September 3 – 13, 1852	115 mph (185 km/h)	965 hPa (28.50 inHg)	The Caribbean, The Bahamas, Florida	Unknown	Unknown	
Four	September 22 – 30, 1852	115 mph (185 km/h)	948 hPa (27.99 inHg)	Greater Antilles	Unknown	Unknown	
Four	September 16 – 20, 1854	125 mph (205 km/h)	Not Specified	Texas	$20,000	4	
Six	October 18 – 26, 1858	115 mph (185 km/h)	955 hPa (28.20 inHg)	No land areas	Unknown	Unknown	
Three	September 8 – 21, 1862	115 mph (185 km/h)	948 hPa (27.99 inHg)	No land areas	Unknown	Unknown	

== Number by month ==
Number of recorded Category 3 Atlantic hurricanes by month
Month	Number of cyclones
June	2
July	6
August	56
September	67
October	30
November	5

== Landfalls ==
Name	Year	Category 3	Category 2	Category 1	Tropical storm	Tropical depression	refs
San Agapito	1851	Florida	Dominican Republic	Cuba	Newfoundland	—	
Mobile	1852	Mississippi	—	Bahamas	—	—	
Coastal	1854	Georgia	—	—	—	—	
Middle Gulf Coast	1855	Louisiana	—	—	—	—	
Southeastern	1856	—	Cuba, Florida	Inagua	—	—	
Unnamed	1859	—	—	Inagua, Cuba	—	—	
San Narciso	1867	St Thomas, Puerto Rico	—	Dominican Republic	—	—	
New England	1869	Rhode Island	—	—	—	—	
San Marcos	1870	Cuba	—	Bahamas	—	—	
Unnamed	1871	Bahamas, Florida	—	—	Georgia	—	
Santa Juana	1871	British Virgin Islands	Bahamas, Florida	—	—	—	
Nova Scotia	1873	—	—	Newfoundland	—	—	
Central Florida	1873	Haiti, Florida	Cuba	—	—	—	
Indianola	1875	Texas	Cuba	—	—	—	
San Felipe	1876	—	—	Dominican Republic	—	—	
Unnamed	1876	Cuba	Florida	—	—	—	
Unnamed	1877	Florida Panhandle	Venezuela	—	—	—	
Great Beaufort	1879	North Carolina	—	Massachusetts	Turks and Caicos, Nova Scotia	—	
Louisiana	1879	Louisiana	—	—	—	—	
Pensacola	1882	Florida	Cuba	Bahamas	—	—	
Bahamas–North Carolina	1883	Hispaniola	Bahamas, North Carolina	—	—	—	
Cuba	1886	Cuba	Saint Vincent, Jamaica, Bahamas	—	—	—	
Unnamed	1886	—	—	Newfoundland	—	—	
Texas–Louisiana	1886	Louisiana	—	Cuba	—	—	
Unnamed	1887	Bahamas	—	—	—	—	
Louisiana	1888	Florida	Bahamas, Louisiana	Bahamas	Bahamas	—	
San Gil	1888	Cuba	Turks and Caicos	Quintana Roo, Veracruz	—	—	
San Magín	1891	Martinique	Dominican Republic, Bahamas	—	—	—	
San Roque	1893	Puerto Rico	—	—	—	—	
Midnight Storm	1893	—	—	New York	—	—	
Sea Islands	1893	Bahamas, Georgia	—	—	—	—	
Great Charleston	1893	South Carolina	—	—	—	—	
Unnamed	1894	—	Dominican Republic, Cuba, Florida	South Carolina	—	—	
Florida Panhandle	1894	Florida	—	New York	—	—	
San Ramón	1896	—	Puerto Rico, Bahamas	Massachusetts	Martinique	—	
Cedar Key	1896	Florida	—	—	—	—	
Unnamed	1899	—	—	Newfoundland	—	—	
Jamaica	1903	Jamaica	Quintana Roo	Martinique, Tamaulipas	—	—	
Mississippi	1906	—	Mississippi	—	—	—	
Florida Keys	1906	Nicaragua, Cuba, Florida	—	Belize	Florida	—	
Unnamed	1908	Bahamas	Bahamas	—	—	—	
Velasco	1909	Texas	—	—	—	—	
Monterrey	1909	Quintana Roo, Tamaulipas	—	Dominican Republic, Cuba	—	—	
Grand Isle	1909	Louisiana	Cuba	—	—	—	
Florida Keys	1909	Cuba, Florida	Bahamas	—	—	—	
Jamaica	1912	Jamaica	—	—	—	—	
Gulf Coast	1916	Mississippi	—	—	—	—	
Charleston	1916	—	South Carolina	—	—	—	
Louisiana	1918	Louisiana	—	—	—	—	
Unnamed	1921	Dominican Republic	—	—	—	—	
Unnamed	1923	—	—	Bahamas	Bahamas	—	
Louisiana	1926	Louisiana	—	—	—	—	
Nova Scotia	1927	—	Nova Scotia	—	—	—	
Cuba-Bahamas	1933	Bahamas	Cuba	—	—	—	
Unnamed	1934	—	—	—	—	Haiti	
Unnamed	1938	Quintana Roo	—	Tamaulipas	—	—	
Texas	1941	Texas	—	—	—	—	
Florida	1941	Bahamas	Bahamas, Florida	Florida	—	—	
Matagorda	1942	Texas	Quintana Roo	—	—	—	
Unnamed	1943	—	—	—	Newfoundland	—	
Jamaica	1944	Jamaica	—	Quintana Roo	Veracruz	—	
Texas	1945	Texas	—	—	—	—	
Fox	1948	Cuba	Florida, Bermuda	—	—	—	
Able	1950	—	—	Nova Scotia	—	—	
Easy	1950	Florida	—	Cuba	—	—	
Florence	1953	—	—	Florida	—	—	
Carol	1954	New York	—	—	—	—	
Edna	1954	—	Massachusetts	—	—	—	
Hilda	1955	Quintana Roo, Tamaulipas	—	Cuba	—	—	
Betsy	1956	—	Guadeloupe, Puerto Rico	—	—	—	
Audrey	1957	Louisiana	—	—	—	—	
Ethel	1960	—	—	Mississippi	—	—	
Arlene	1963	—	Bermuda	—	—	—	
Isbell	1964	—	Cuba, Florida	—	—	—	
Alma	1966	—	Cuba	Florida	—	—	
Francelia	1969	—	Belize	—	—	—	
Gerda	1969	—	Maine	—	—	Florida	
Ella	1970	Tamaulipas	—	—	—	Quintana Roo	
Caroline	1975	Tamaulipas	—	—	—	Turks and Caicos, Cuba	
Eloise	1975	Florida	—	Dominican Republic	Cuba, Quintana Roo	—	
Belle	1976	—	—	New York	—	—	
Alicia	1983	Texas	—	—	—	—	
Elena	1985	Mississippi	—	—	—	Cuba	
Kate	1985	—	Cuba, Florida	—	—	—	
Emily	1987	—	Dominican Republic	Bermuda	Saint Vincent	—	
Bob	1991	—	Rhode Island	—	—	—	
Marilyn	1995	—	Saint Croix	Dominica	—	—	
Roxanne	1995	Quintana Roo	—	—	—	—	
Bertha	1996	—	North Carolina	—	—	—	
Fran	1996	North Carolina	—	—	—	—	
Lili	1996	—	Cuba, Bahamas	—	—	—	
Bonnie	1998	—	North Carolina	—	—	—	
Isidore	2002	Yucatán	—	Cuba	Louisiana	Trinidad and Tobago, Venezuela	
Jeanne	2004	Bahamas, Florida	—	Dominican Republic	Puerto Rico, Turks and Caicos	Guadeloupe	
Beta	2005	—	Nicaragua	—	—	—	
Karl	2010	Veracruz	—	—	Quintana Roo	—	
Irene	2011	Bahamas	Bahamas	North Carolina	Puerto Rico, New Jersey, New York	—	
Rina	2011	—	—	—	Quintana Roo	—	
Sandy	2012	Cuba	—	Jamaica	—	—	
Otto	2016	Nicaragua	—	—	—	—	
Zeta	2020	Louisiana	—	Quintana Roo	—	—	
Grace	2021	Veracruz	—	Quintana Roo	Jamaica	—	
Larry	2021	—	—	Newfoundland	—	—	
Rafael	2024	Cuba	—	—	—	—	
Isaias	2026	—	Florida	—	—	—	

== See also ==
- List of Category 4 Atlantic hurricanes
- List of Category 5 Atlantic hurricanes
- List of Category 3 Pacific hurricanes
