= Hurricane Rina =

Category 3 Atlantic hurricane in 2011

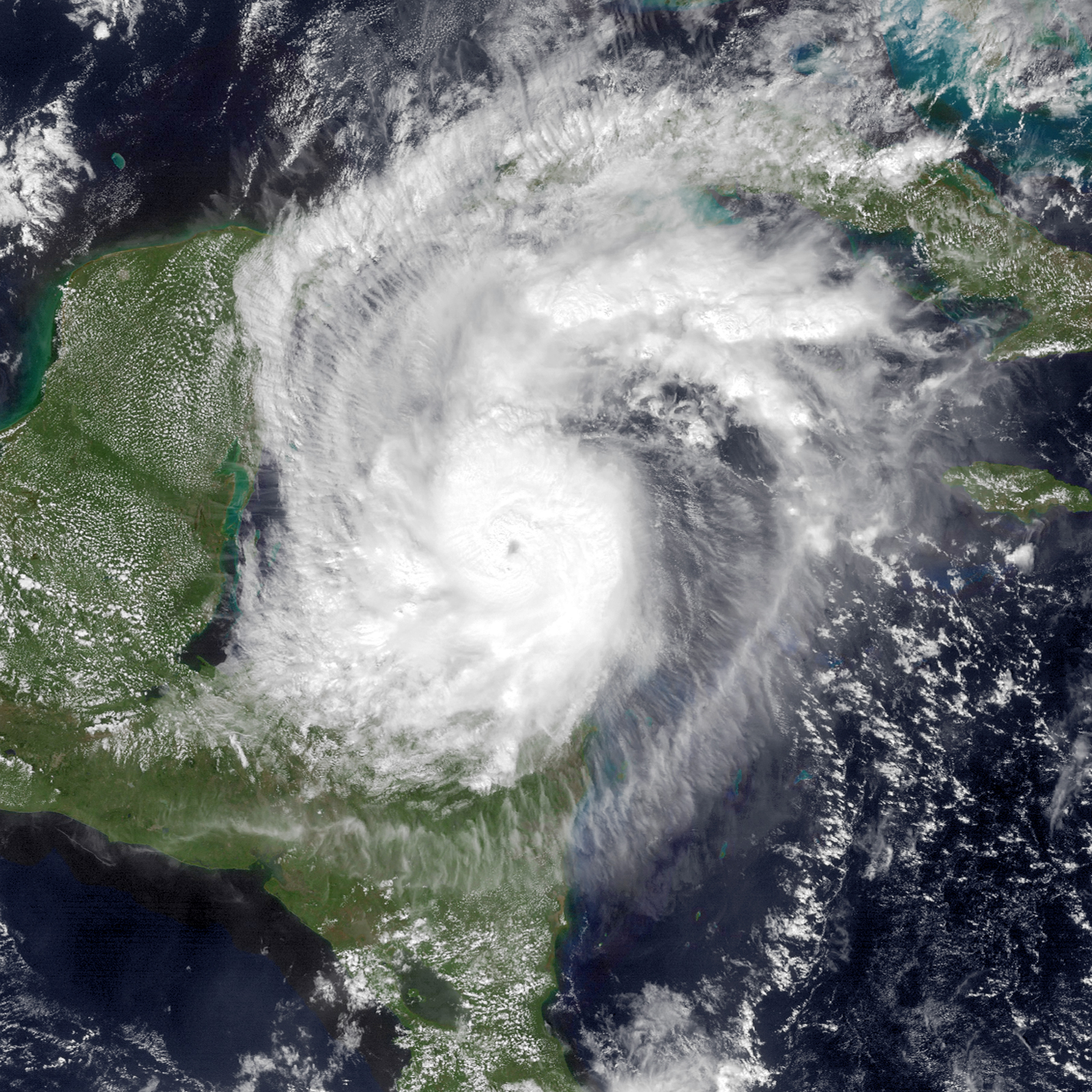
- Hurricane Rina near peak intensity to the north of Honduras on October 25

Meteorological history
- Formed: October 23, 2011
- Remnant low: October 28, 2011
- Dissipated: October 29, 2011

Category 3 major hurricane
- 1-minute sustained (SSHWS/NWS)
- Highest winds: 115 mph (185 km/h)
- Lowest pressure: 966 mbar (hPa); 28.53 inHg

Overall effects
- Fatalities: None
- Damage: $2.3 million (2011 USD)
- Areas affected: Central America, Yucatán Peninsula, Cuba, Florida
- IBTrACS
- Part of the 2011 Atlantic hurricane season

Hurricane Rina was a small and slow-moving, but powerful tropical cyclone that caused minor impacts in the northwestern Caribbean Sea in late October 2011. The seventeenth named storm, seventh and final hurricane, and fourth and final major hurricane of the annual hurricane season, (Note: A major hurricane is a storm that ranks as Category 3 or higher on the Saffir–Simpson hurricane wind scale.) Rina developed from a tropical wave in the western Caribbean on October 23. The depression quickly intensified, and was upgraded to Tropical Storm Rina early on the following day. Further strengthening ensued as it tracked west-northwestward, with Rina becoming a hurricane on October 24. The hurricane eventually peaked as a Category 3 hurricane while it moved generally westward on October 25. However, on October 26, Rina weakened substantially and was downgraded to a Category 1 hurricane. Further weakening occurred, with Rina falling to tropical storm intensity on October 27. Rina then made landfall in northern Quintana Roo early the next day. The cyclone degenerated into a remnant low later on October 28 after emerging into the Yucatán Channel. The low dissipated near the western tip of Cuba on October 29.

Several tropical cyclone warnings and watches were issued in anticipation of the storm in Belize, Honduras, and Mexico. Carnival Cruise Line changed eight of its ships' itineraries to avoid the developing cyclone. In Mexico, hundreds were ordered to evacuate from Punta Allen. Authorities set up 50 emergency shelters in Cancún. However, because the storm weakened significantly prior to landfall, only minor impact occurred in Mexico, mainly limited to flooding in some low-lying areas and downed trees and power lines. Convergence caused by a cold front and moisture from Rina resulted in heavy rainfall over portions of southeastern Florida. A number of streets were inundated and dozens of homes received water damage in Broward, Miami-Dade, and Palm Beach counties. In Broward County alone, about 160 homes were flooded. Farther north, two tornadoes were spawned in the vicinity of Hobe Sound, one of which damaged 42 mobile homes, 2 vehicles, and a number of trees. Throughout Florida, damage reached approximately $2.3 million (2011 USD). (Note: All damage figures are in 2011 USD, unless otherwise noted.)

== Meteorological history ==
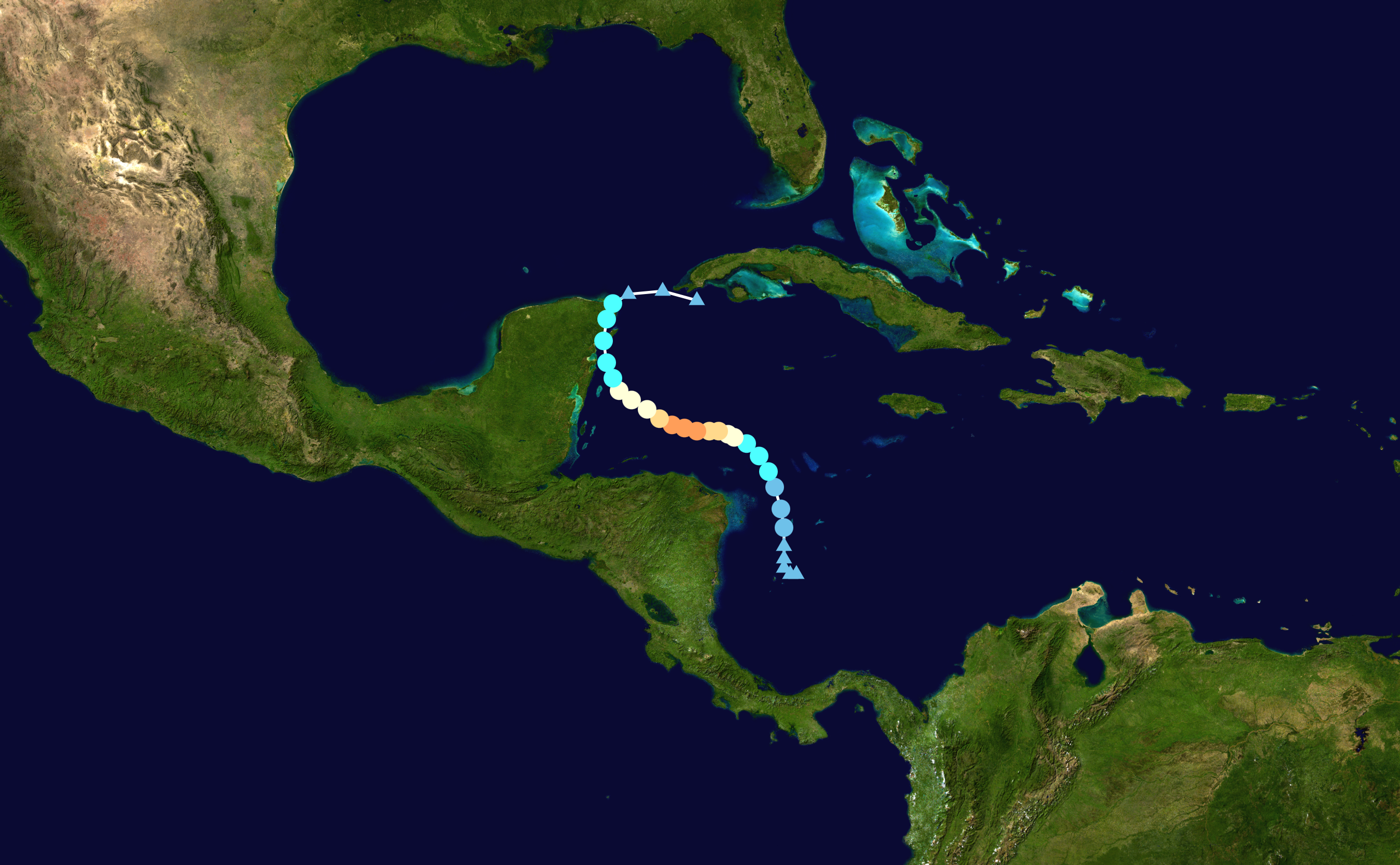
Map plotting the storm's track and intensity, according to the Saffir–Simpson scale Map key Saffir–Simpson scale Tropical depression (≤38 mph, ≤62 km/h) Tropical storm (39–73 mph, 63–118 km/h) Category 1 (74–95 mph, 119–153 km/h) Category 2 (96–110 mph, 154–177 km/h) Category 3 (111–129 mph, 178–208 km/h) Category 4 (130–156 mph, 209–251 km/h) Category 5 (≥157 mph, ≥252 km/h) Unknown Storm type Tropical cyclone Subtropical cyclone Extratropical cyclone, remnant low, tropical disturbance, or monsoon depression

A tropical wave emerged from the west coast of Africa on October 9. Reaching the Atlantic at a relatively low latitude, the wave initially had little convection, before showers and thunderstorms briefly increased on October 12 as the system interacted with an upper-level trough. However, convection soon diminished and remained minimal under the wave crossed the Windward Islands on October 16. Upon reaching the western Caribbean Sea, the wave began showing signs of development on October 19, but wind shear was too hostile for tropical cyclogenesis. Later that day, a cold front entered the northwestern Caribbean and may have contributed to the further development of the system. A broad low-pressure area formed on October 21, after convection intensified near the wave's axis. However, the upper-level winds were only described as "marginally favorable" and relatively dry air in the region was expected to act as a hindrance to development. Throughout the day on October 22, atmospheric pressures decreased and the circulation continuously became better defined, while convection increased significantly on the western side of the system and near the center. Around 06:00 UTC on October 23, the system strengthened into Tropical Depression Eighteen, while situated about 65 mi (105 km) north of Providencia Island.

The depression initially moved northward into a weakness in a ridge, caused by a broad mid-level trough situated over the Southeastern United States. The National Hurricane Center (NHC) began issuing advisories at 21:00 UTC on October 23 and initially anticipated that atmospheric conditions would only be favorable enough over the following five days for the depression to reach moderate or strong tropical storm intensity. By 00:00 UTC on the following day, the depression intensified into Tropical Storm Rina. Thereafter, easterly wind shear decreased significantly, allowing Rina to strengthen into a Category 1 hurricane late on October 24 while moving over warm sea surface temperatures. The hurricane then re-curved westward as the mid- to upper-level ridging re-intensified over the Gulf of Mexico.

Satellite imagery began to show the presence of convective bands and reconnaissance flights showed that the hurricane had slowed down in its movement to the west-northwest. The hurricane continued to strengthen over warm waters with low wind shear, and by 0600 UTC of October 25, the hurricane had become a Category 2 storm. Rina continued to intensify as the day progressed, as winds increased and a small eye began to develop, due to the hurricane's location over very warm ocean waters and well established upper-level outflow. The hurricane continued its west-northwestern track around a mid-level ridge to its north. Due to the favorable environment, Rina continued to strengthen through the early evening, becoming a Category 3 major hurricane at 1800 UTC. Six hours later, Rina achieved its peak intensity with sustained winds of 115 mph (185 km/h) and a minimum barometric pressure of 966 mbar (hPa; 28.53 inHg) when located about 253 miles (407 km) east-southeast of Chetumal.

However, Rina's peak intensity did not last very long, and it dropped below major hurricane strength twelve hours after peak intensity. By October 26, Rina significantly weakened due to increasing wind shear, and was downgraded to a Category 1 hurricane at 1800 UTC. The system moved generally toward the west-northwest and northwest on that day as it was steered around the periphery of the ridge. By 1200 UTC on October 27, the system was downgraded to a tropical storm while located about 86 miles (138 km) south-southeast of Tulum, Mexico. A turn to the north commenced later that day, with strong wind shear causing additional weakening. At 0200 UTC on October 28, The storm made landfall near Paamul, about 12 miles (19 km) southwest of Playa del Carmen, with winds of 60 mph (95 km/h). Strong wind shear caused all convection near the center to dissipate, and Rina degenerated into a remnant low in the Yucatan Channel by 1800 UTC that day. The remnant low moved toward the east-northeast and east within the low-level flow ahead of a cold front, and dissipated early the next day just southeast of the western tip of Cuba.

== Preparations and impact ==
=== Latin America ===
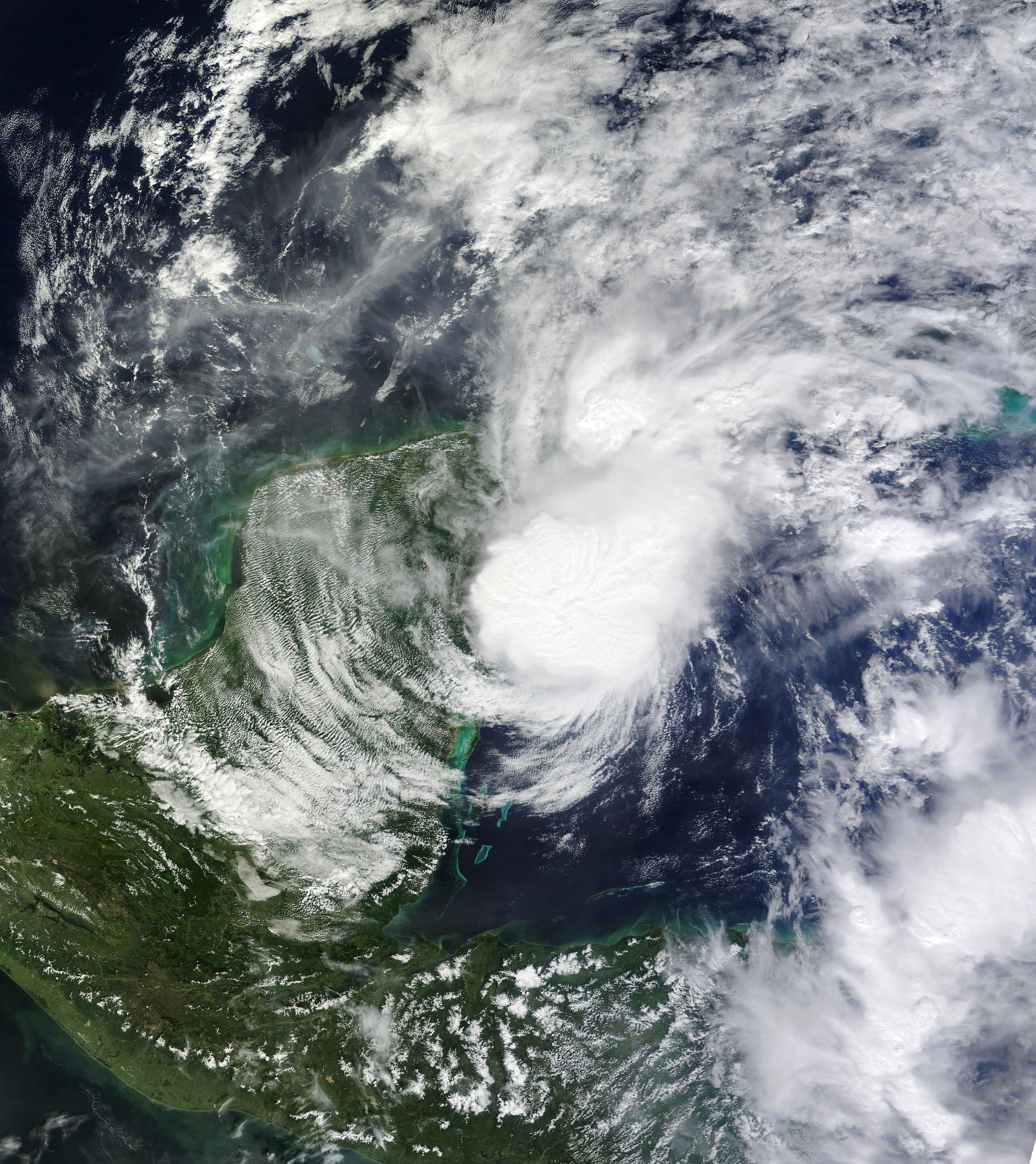
Tropical Storm Rina approaching Yucatán Peninsula on October 27

Upon designation, Rina prompted the issuance of a tropical storm watch stretching from Punta Castilla, Nicaragua to the Honduras–Nicaragua border; after the system passed to the north, the watch was discontinued. At 0900 UTC on October 25, a tropical storm watch was issued from Chetumal, Mexico to Punta Gruesa, Mexico, while a hurricane watch was issued from Punta Gruesa to Cancún, Mexico. At 1500 UTC that same day, both watches were revised to warnings. After several provisions and modifications, all tropical cyclone watches and warnings were discontinued at 1500 UTC on October 28.

In preparation for the storm, Nicaraguan President Daniel Ortega ordered a navy vessel to evacuate residents from low-lying portions of the country; however, contact was lost with the ship for two days. All 29 passengers were later found unharmed. Meanwhile, Carnival Cruise Line changed eight of its ships' itineraries to avoid the developing cyclone. The governor of Quintana Roo ordered hundreds of people to evacuate from the village of Punta Allen to storm shelters. In Cancún, authorities set up 50 emergency shelters while city residents purchased supplies and filled up on gas. Marine parks in and around the city were forced to move over two dozen dolphins to safer locations further inland. Small boats and jet skis were hauled away from local marinas, while workers at nearby shopping centers began boarding up their windows.

At its landfall in Yucatán Peninsula, Rina produced a maximum wind gust near 44 mph (71 km/h) in Puerto Aventuras. Otherwise, as a result of the system's abrupt weakening, impact remained negligible.

=== United States ===
The National Aeronautics and Space Administration (NASA) was forced to cut an environmental mission short in order to avoid the projected path of the hurricane, with the agency determining that the storm posed enough of a threat to their Extreme Environment Mission Operations near Key Largo, Florida. While Rina was weakening inland over the Yucatán Peninsula, mid and upper-level moisture began reaching South Florida as a cold front moved southward across the state. This caused convergence, which in turn resulted in the development of heavy showers and thunderstorms over southeastern Florida. Early on October 29, a flash flood warning was issued for southern Palm Beach and northern Broward counties. Shortly thereafter, a flood watch was issued for the remainder of Palm Beach and Broward counties and also included Collier, Glades, Hendry, and Miami-Dade counties. A brief break in the rain on the morning of October 29, heavy precipitation resumed that afternoon. Rainfall totals peaked at 15.79 in (401 mm) in Boca West, while Fort Lauderdale observed of slightly less amount of 15.23 in (387 mm). The rains caused Miami Beach to have its wettest month of October on record. In some areas of southeast Florida, 5 to 7 in (130 to 180 mm) of precipitation fell in less than six hours.

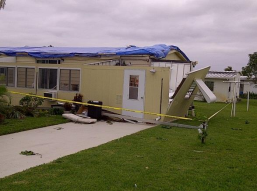
A mobile home damaged by a tornado in Hobe Sound

The heavy rainfall left about 2,000 customers in South Florida without electricity. In Miami-Dade County, water inundated a numerous roads and entered dozens of homes, especially in Coral Gables, Coconut Grove, Cutler Bay, Key Biscayne, and Palmetto Bay, with water reaching 4 ft (1.2 m) in height in some areas. The western half of Key Biscayne was submerged. In Broward County, at least 160 homes and buildings suffered water damage. Several streets were closed in Fort Lauderdale, Oakland Park, Pompano Beach, and Wilton Manors. A shelter was opened for displaced residents in Fort Lauderdale. Canals also overflowed in Coral Springs. A number of streets were flooded in Palm Beach County, especially in Boca Raton, Boynton Beach, Delray Beach, and Highland Beach, but water entered no homes or buildings. In western Palm Beach County, rainfall flooded some farmlands, causing a delay in harvesting sugar cane and halting vegetable planting. Lake Okeechobee stood at 13.47 ft (4.11 m) on October 31, about 2.34 ft (0.71 m) higher than a month earlier.

Farther north, two tornadoes were spawned in the Hobe Sound area on October 29, both rated EF0 on the Enhanced Fujita scale. The first tornado damaged 42 mobile homes, with one losing its roof, which was carried approximately 150 ft (46 m) downwind. Two vehicles were damaged and several trees were uprooted or lost branches. The other tornado caused similar impact, with a number of mobile homes damaged. After briefly lifting, the tornado touched-down again in a heavily wooded community, stripping branches from several trees. While crossing the Intracoastal Waterway, the tornado damaged five boats, one of which recorded a 75 mph (121 km/h) wind gust. Throughout Florida, damage reached approximately $2.3 million.

== See also ==
- Weather of 2011
- List of Category 3 Atlantic hurricanes
- List of Cuba hurricanes
- Hurricane Paula (2010) – took a nearly identical track as Rina at a similar intensity in October 2010
