= Hurricane Roxanne =

Category 3 Atlantic hurricane in 1995

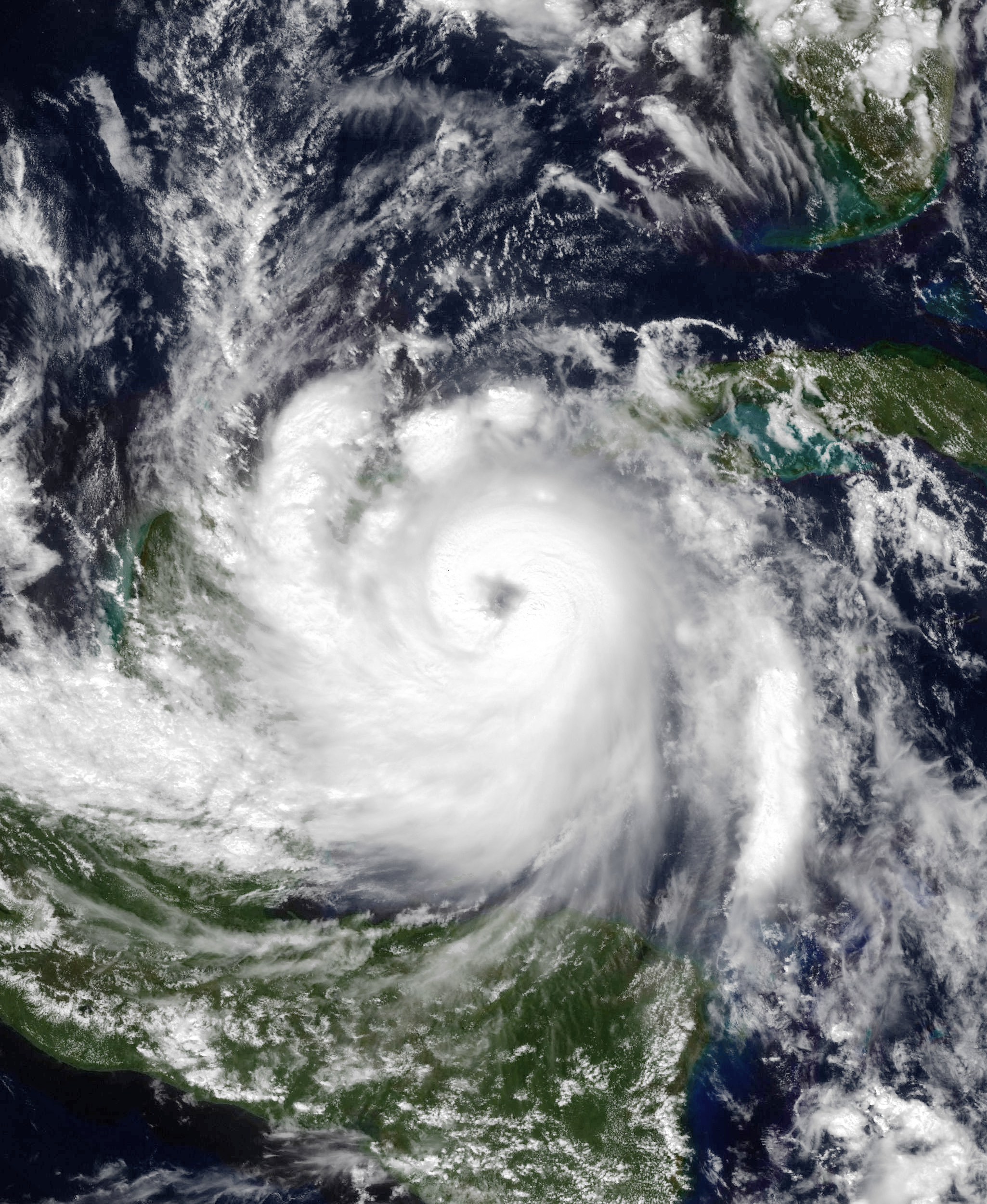
- Roxanne rapidly intensifying while east of the Yucatán Peninsula on October 10

Meteorological history
- Formed: October 7, 1995
- Dissipated: October 21, 1995

Category 3 major hurricane
- 1-minute sustained (SSHWS/NWS)
- Highest winds: 115 mph (185 km/h)
- Lowest pressure: 956 mbar (hPa); 28.23 inHg

Overall effects
- Fatalities: 29 total
- Damage: $1.5 billion (1995 USD)
- Areas affected: Mexico (especially the Yucatán Peninsula)
- IBTrACS
- Part of the 1995 Atlantic hurricane season

Hurricane Roxanne was a rare and erratic tropical cyclone that caused extensive flooding in Mexico due to its unusual movement. The seventeenth storm, tenth hurricane, and the fifth and final major hurricane of the very active 1995 Atlantic hurricane season, Roxanne developed in the southwestern Caribbean Sea from an area of low pressure on October 7. The depression curved northward, causing it to avoid landfall in Central America. By October 9, the depression intensified enough to be upgraded to Tropical Storm Roxanne. On the following day, Roxanne turned west-northward, where it promptly intensified into a hurricane. As Roxanne headed generally westward, it began to rapidly deepen and reached Category 3 intensity less than 24 hours after becoming a hurricane. Shortly thereafter, Roxanne made landfall near Cozumel, Mexico at its peak intensity, which caused severe damage.

Roxanne rapidly weakened while traversing the Yucatán Peninsula, and when it emerged into the Bay of Campeche on October 12, the storm was a Category 1 hurricane. Further weakening occurred, and Roxanne was downgraded to a tropical storm later that day. Roxanne tracked northwestward and eventually re-intensified into a hurricane on October 14. Thereafter, Roxanne began to meander erratically in the Gulf of Mexico; the storm turned abruptly southeastward and remained nearly stationary offshore of the Yucatan Peninsula. The following day, Roxanne curved back northwestward and weakened back to a tropical storm on October 17. Roxanne completed a cyclonic loop across the Gulf of Mexico on October 18. Further weakening occurred, and Roxanne was downgraded to a tropical depression on October 19. A cold front in the Gulf of Mexico turned Roxanne abruptly southward, and the storm dissipated just offshore of Veracruz on October 21.

Roxanne was the first October hurricane that formed and reached Category 3 intensity on the Saffir-Simpson Hurricane Scale (SSHS) in the western Caribbean Sea since Hurricane Hattie in October 1961. Due to its slow and erratic movement, Roxanne dropped heavy rainfall in many areas of southern Mexico, and some areas reported over 25 inches (640 mm) of precipitation. Heavy rainfall, in turn, led to extensive flooding, which destroyed crop, washed out roads, and damaged at least 40,000 homes. In addition, significant coastal flooding also occurred, as storm surge for nearly a week caused water to travel inland for hundreds of yards. High winds also occurred over the Yucatan Peninsula, with one station reporting hurricane-force winds on October 11. Overall, it is estimated that Roxanne caused $1.5 billion (1995 USD) in damage, although not all damage could be distinguished from Hurricane Opal. In addition, 29 fatalities were reported.

== Meteorological history ==
Map plotting the storm's track and intensity, according to the Saffir–Simpson scale Map key Saffir–Simpson scale Tropical depression (≤38 mph, ≤62 km/h) Tropical storm (39–73 mph, 63–118 km/h) Category 1 (74–95 mph, 119–153 km/h) Category 2 (96–110 mph, 154–177 km/h) Category 3 (111–129 mph, 178–208 km/h) Category 4 (130–156 mph, 209–251 km/h) Category 5 (≥157 mph, ≥252 km/h) Unknown Storm type Tropical cyclone Subtropical cyclone Extratropical cyclone, remnant low, tropical disturbance, or monsoon depression

A tropical wave exited the west coast of Africa on September 26. It moved westward, producing an area of convection, or thunderstorms, over the central Caribbean Sea by October 4. By two days later, the system had a broad circulation located between the coast of Honduras and the Cayman Islands. An upper-level trough, left behind after Hurricane Opal exited the region, interacted with the tropical wave and the circulation, which gradually became better organized; the origins were complex, but common for disturbances over the western Caribbean. By October 7, banding features developed within the convection. Late that day, the system organized enough for the National Hurricane Center (NHC) to designate it Tropical Depression Nineteen, located off the northeast tip of Nicaragua. A day later, the Hurricane Hunters confirmed the development of the circulation. While in its formative stages, the depression moved northward, steered by a nearby upper-level low, amid weak steering currents caused by a subtropical ridge over the southwestern Atlantic Ocean. Early on October 9, the NHC upgraded the depression to Tropical Storm Roxanne. Roxanne was the first ever “R” named storm in the Atlantic basin.

Roxanne was initially affected by winds from the north, which dislocated the circulation from the convection. As the nearby upper-level low moved into Central America, Roxanne was able to intensify, developing outflow all around the storm. Initially, the storm threatened western Cuba and the Cayman Islands, steered by a weak trough over Florida, which moved eastward and was replaced by a ridge in the area. This turned Roxanne westward toward the Yucatán Peninsula. At the same time it was turning, Roxanne developed a well-defined eye in the center of its convection. At 06:00 UTC on October 10, the storm intensified to hurricane status. Roxanne intensified further, based on reports from the Hurricane Hunters. Early on October 11, the NHC estimated peak winds of 115 mph (185 km/h); this made Roxanne the first hurricane since Hurricane Hattie in 1961 to develop in the western Caribbean and intensify to a major hurricane. Shortly after Roxanne reached peak intensity, the hurricane made landfall just north of Tulum, a small town near Cozumel, Mexico.

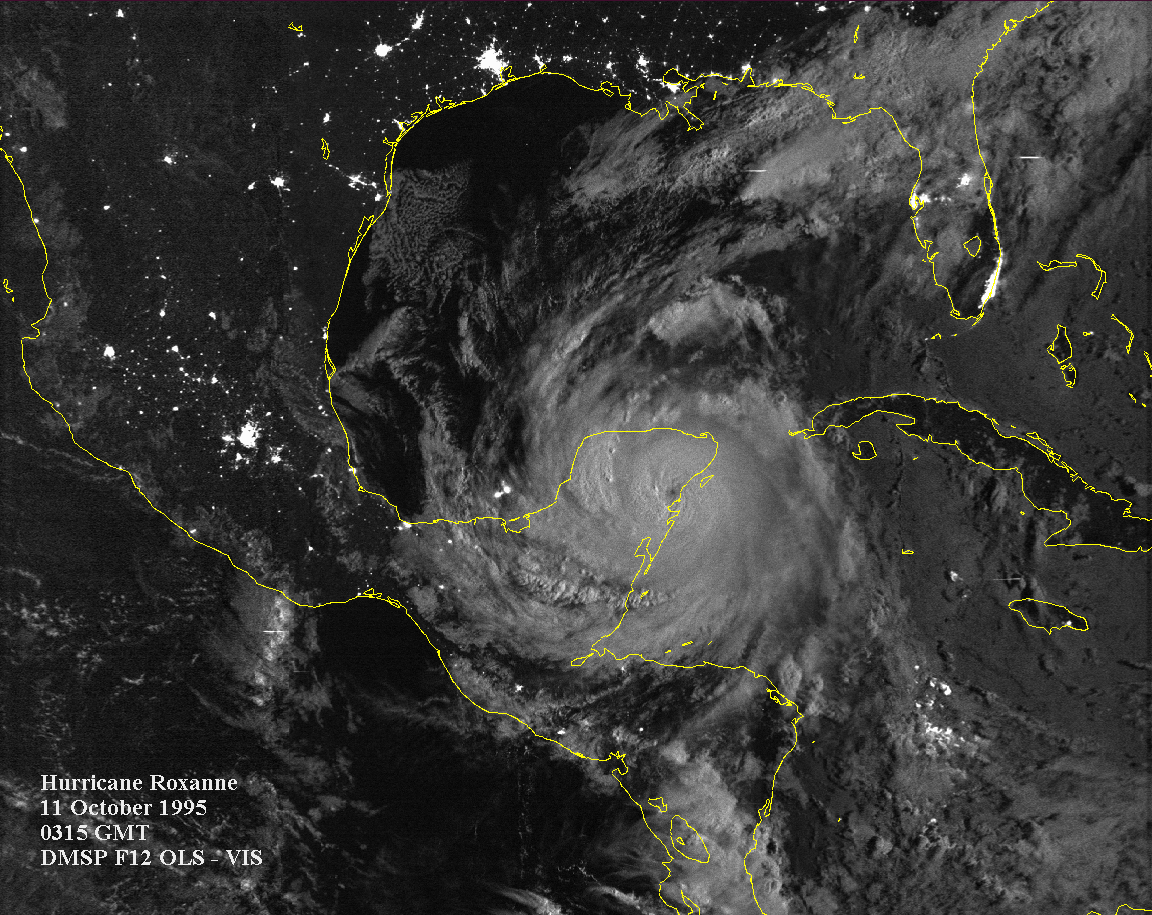
Roxanne making landfall on the Yucatán Peninsula

Moving westward across the Yucatán Peninsula, Roxanne weakened but maintained hurricane status as it emerged into the Bay of Campeche on October 12. Although the storm remained well-organized, it lost most of its deep convection and intensity. The storm drifted in the body of water, steered by a ridge to the north. On October 12, Roxanne weakened to tropical storm status. The storm continued northwestward and turned more to the north, steered by a cold front. Roxanne redeveloped an eye feature, and it re-intensified into a hurricane on October 14. The hurricane turned to the southeast, after the cold front bypassed the system and the ridge rebuilt. Over the next day, Roxanne stalled off the northwest coast of the Yucatán Peninsula. Drier air, wind shear, and upwelling caused the hurricane to weaken back to a tropical storm. By late on October 17, the circulation had little convection associated with it. The storm moved northwestward for a few days, until an approaching cold front steered Roxanne to the south on October 19; by that time, Roxanne had weakened to tropical depression status. On October 21, the circulation of Roxanne was dissipating as it moved onshore Veracruz.

== Preparations ==
Early in Roxanne's existence, its northward movement presented a threat to the western Caribbean. As a result, the government of the Cayman Islands declared a tropical storm warning for all of the islands on October 9; On the same day, the government of Cuba issued a hurricane watch and tropical storm warning for Pinar del Río and the Isle of Youth. The advisories were canceled after the storm turned away from the area.

Parts of Mexico were under tropical cyclone warnings and watches for ten days. On October 9, the government of Mexico raised hurricane watches for coastal areas between Chetumal, Quintana Roo and Cabo Catoche. Early on October 10, a hurricane warning was declared for areas west of Cabo Catoche to Progreso, Yucatán. By the afternoon, the hurricane watch was extended past Progreso to Ciudad del Carmen, which was upgraded to a hurricane warning the next day. A new tropical storm warning was issued by the government of Belize that evening for areas north of Belize City; however, this warning was discontinued early on October 11 as the center of Roxanne was not expected to pass near the area. With Roxanne maintaining its intensity over the Yucatán, the Mexican government issued a hurricane warning from Coatzacoalcos to Tuxpan, as the storm was initially projected to go more westward. When Roxanne was looping off the northwest Yucatán peninsula, a hurricane warning was issued from Progreso to Tampico. The last warnings were downgraded on October 19, when Roxanne weakened to a tropical depression.

In the Yucatán Peninsula, thousands of residents and tourists were urged to evacuate from coastal areas. In the city of Cancún, roughly 12,000 tourists and 3,900 residents relocated to safer areas; however, some refused to leave and decided to wait out the storm in hotels. On Cozumel, most hotel guests decided to ride out the storm instead of evacuate. There, most homeowners and businesses stored all loose items indoors and boarded up windows. An emergency alert was issued to hundreds of fishermen off the Yucatán coastline to move to port immediately. In the state of Campeche, 150 shelters were opened and able to accommodate roughly 15,000 people. However, more than 20,000 people sought refuge from the storm throughout the state.

== Impact ==
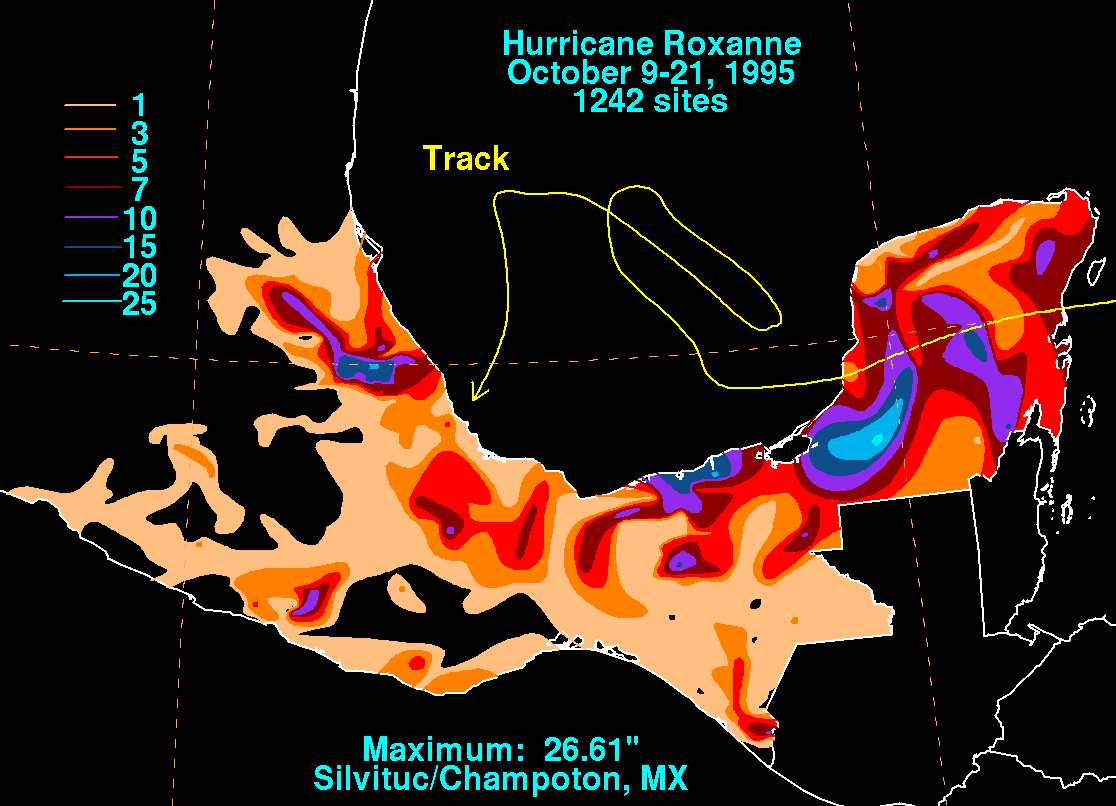
Roxanne Rainfall across Mexico

Roxanne affected the Yucatán Peninsula less than two weeks after Hurricane Opal formed in the area. The combined damage between the two hurricanes was estimated at US$1.5 billion. At least two locations in Mexico reported sustained hurricane-force winds from Roxanne – Mérida, Yucatán and Paraíso, Tabasco. At the former location, an automatic weather station recorded a wind gust of 202 km/h (126 mph) on October 11. Roxanne dropped heavy rainfall along its path. Near Champotón, Campeche, a pluviometer recorded 676 mm (26.61 in) of precipitation, the highest total in the country related to Roxanne. Locations in Veracruz and Tabasco also recorded over 510 mm (20 in) of rainfall. While Roxanne was moving ashore eastern Mexico, it produced an estimated storm surge of 3.0 m (10 ft). Waves washed into hotel lobbies in Cancún and Cozumel. In the Gulf of Mexico, 15 to 20 ft (4.6 to 6.1 m) waves struck the Mexican coast while Roxanne drifted offshore for a few days, pushing water hundreds of yards inland. Waves eroded the eastern portion of Ciudad del Carmen, while the western portion of the island gained sand.

Roxanne caused 29 deaths, with six of them coming from the sinking of the pipelay derrick barge DLB 269 with 245 people on board. Roxanne caused widespread flooding and agriculture damage in eastern Mexico, notably in Campeche, Tabasco, Veracruz. Along the coast, high waves wrecked docks, fishing stalls, and nets while damaging dozens of boats. Across eastern Mexico, Roxanne damaged more than 40,000 homes. Crops were destroyed, cattle drowned, and roads were either washed out or blocked by mudslides. The road between the City of Carmen and Campeche was completely destroyed. Rainfall and storm surge combined with overflowing rivers caused the worst flooding in Campeche since 1927. Floodwaters damaged the aqueduct for Ciudad del Carmen. Throughout the state of Tabasco, nearly half of the highways sustained significant damage. Governor Roberto Madrazo Pintado estimated that it would cost roughly $60 million to repair them.

Roxanne caused the state owned Pemex to shut down 90% of its drilling in the Gulf of Mexico during its pass as well as halt all shipments from three oil terminals in the southeastern region of the gulf. As a result, Mexico lost millions of dollars. Oil production dropped from 2.838 million barrels a day in September to 1.976 million barrels a day in October or 30.4%. (A rough guess using a price of the Maya Crude averaging about $13.77/b, 30 days in September, and 862,000 barrels a day of lost output yields $356 million, which in 2011 dollars equals about $530 million.) Oil production didn't completely recover in November, so there were some additional losses, but did completely return in December. The Mexican government allocated 16 million pesos to people affected by Roxanne, as well as 55 million pesos to fishermen.

== Retirement ==
Due to the scale of the damage the hurricane caused in Mexico, the World Meteorological Organization retired the name Roxanne in the spring of 1996, and it will never again be used for a North Atlantic tropical storm. The name was replaced with Rebekah for the 2001 season.

== See also ==
- Timeline of the 1995 Atlantic hurricane season
- List of retired Atlantic hurricane names
- List of Category 3 Atlantic hurricanes
- Hurricane Stan (2005)
- Hurricane Richard (2010)
