= 1948 Miami hurricane =

Category 4 Atlantic hurricane in 1948

Hurricane Nine (Fox)
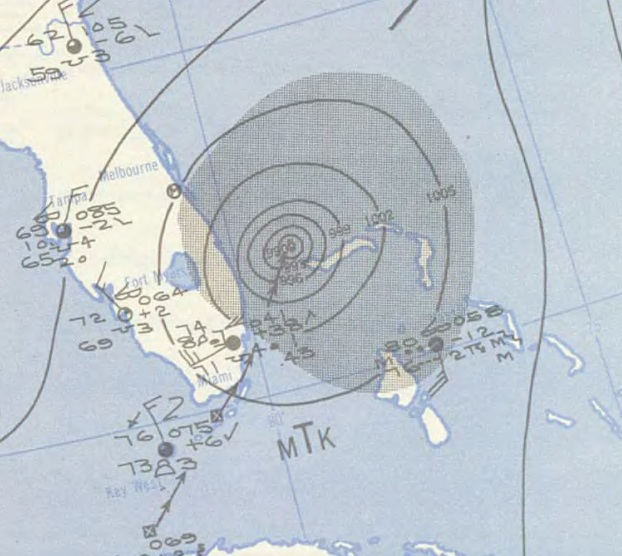
- Surface weather analysis of the hurricane on October 6

Meteorological history
- Formed: October 3, 1948
- Dissipated: October 16, 1948

Category 3 major hurricane
- 1-minute sustained (SSHWS/NWS)
- Highest winds: 125 mph (205 km/h)
- Lowest pressure: ≤971 mbar (hPa); ≤28.67 inHg

Overall effects
- Fatalities: 11 direct
- Damage: $12.5 million (1948 USD)
- Areas affected: Cuba, Florida, Bahamas, Bermuda
- IBTrACS
- Part of the 1948 Atlantic hurricane season

The 1948 Miami hurricane (Air Weather Service designation: Fox) caused no fatalities in Florida, despite moving across the Miami area as a hurricane. The ninth tropical storm and fifth hurricane of the 1948 season, the storm developed from a large low pressure area over the northwestern Caribbean Sea on October 3. The storm intensified into a tropical storm early the next day and a hurricane several hours later. Fox then significantly deepened, peaking with winds of 125 mph (201 km/h) early on October 5. Around that time, Fox made landfall in eastern Pinar del Río Province of Cuba. Fox crossed the island and emerged into the Straits of Florida. Late on October 5, the hurricane struck Bahia Honda Key, Florida, with winds of 105 mph (169 km/h) and two hours later, hit Flamingo. Fox emerged into the Atlantic Ocean near Fort Lauderdale early on October 6. The storm moved northeastward and later curved to the east-northeast. Late on October 7, Fox made landfall on Bermuda with winds of 105 mph (169 km/h). Fox weakened over the next several days and later executed a large cyclonic loop. By October 16, it became extratropical while well east-southeast of Newfoundland.

In Cuba, homes and cattle were swept away by flash flooding. Eleven deaths and about 300 injuries were attributed to the tropical cyclone. Damage in the country reached about $6 million. The storm brought strong winds to Florida, with a sustained wind speed of 122 mph (196 km/h) at Naval Air Station Key West. Heavy rainfall exceeding 9.5 in (240 mm) in Miami and three tornadoes also contributed to the damage in South Florida. Throughout the state, 674 homes were severely damaged or destroyed, while 45 other buildings were demolished. Overall, damage in Florida reached $5.5 million and there were no deaths, but 36 injuries, none of which were serious. In Bermuda, buildings were unroofed and the sides of some structures were knocked down. Electrical light wires and telephone lines were toppled across the island. Damage totaled over $1 million.

== Meteorological history ==
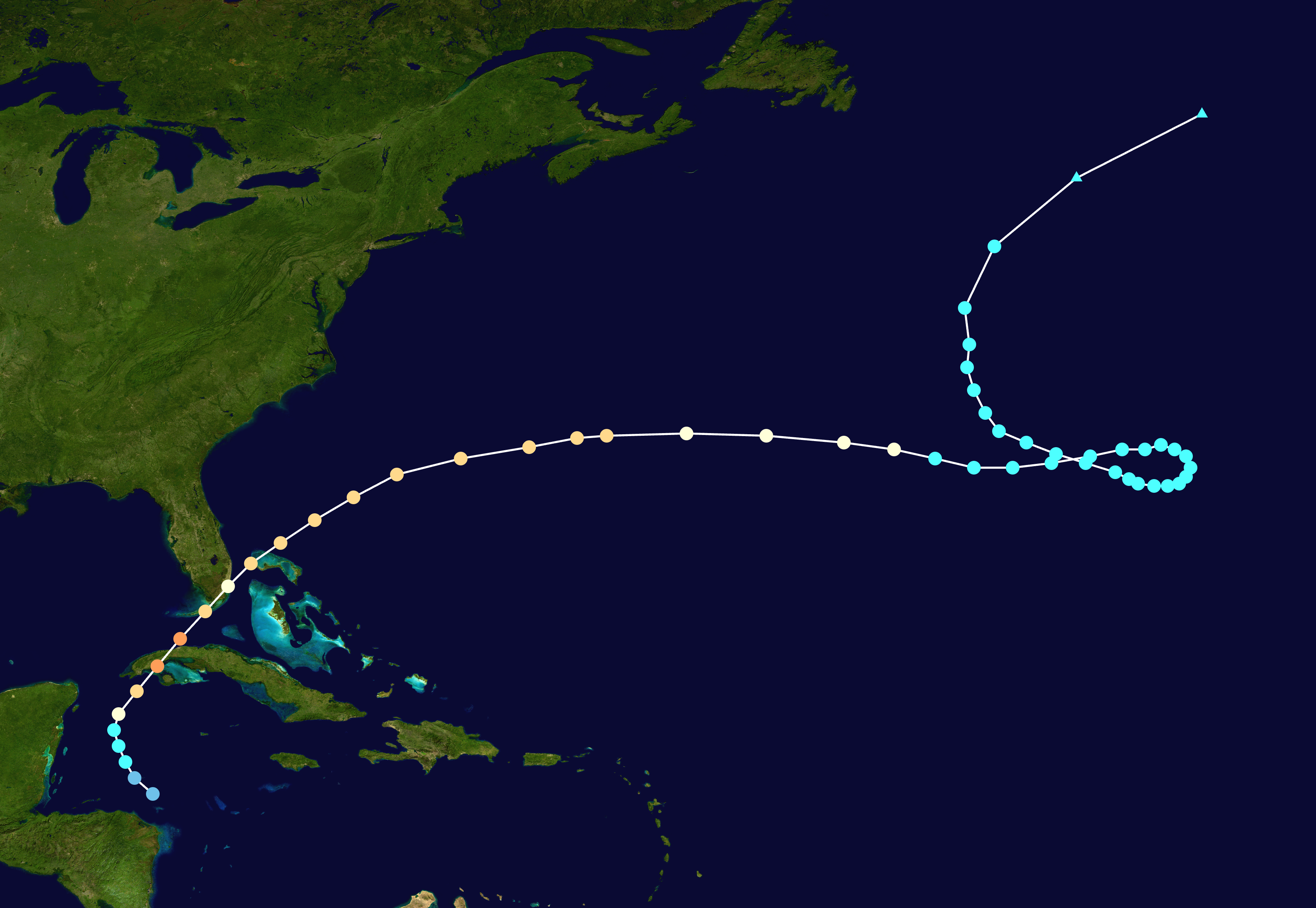
Map plotting the storm's track and intensity, according to the Saffir–Simpson scale Map key Saffir–Simpson scale Tropical depression (≤38 mph, ≤62 km/h) Tropical storm (39–73 mph, 63–118 km/h) Category 1 (74–95 mph, 119–153 km/h) Category 2 (96–110 mph, 154–177 km/h) Category 3 (111–129 mph, 178–208 km/h) Category 4 (130–156 mph, 209–251 km/h) Category 5 (≥157 mph, ≥252 km/h) Unknown Storm type Tropical cyclone Subtropical cyclone Extratropical cyclone, remnant low, tropical disturbance, or monsoon depression

A very large but weak and elongated low pressure area first noted over the Intertropical Convergence Zone on October 1 developed into a tropical depression around 12:00 UTC on October 3, while situated about 55 mi (89 km) southeast of the Swan Islands. The storm intensified into a tropical storm early on October 4 and was designated as Tropical Storm Fox by the Air Weather Service in real time, although the name Fox is not included in HURDAT. Several hours later, the storm intensified into a Category 1 hurricane on the Saffir–Simpson hurricane wind scale. A reconnaissance flight into the hurricane late on October 4 indicated winds near the center estimated at 90 mph (140 km/h). Early the following day, Fox became a Category 2 hurricane. At 06:00 UTC the system peaked as a Category 3 hurricane with maximum sustained winds of 125 mph (201 km/h). About an hour later, Fox made landfall at the same intensity in eastern Pinar del Río Province of Cuba. Shortly before 12:00 UTC on October 5, the storm emerged into the Straits of Florida. Prior to reanalysis in 2014, it was thought that Fox briefly strengthened into a Category 4 hurricane with winds of 130 mph (210 km/h), but reanalysis instead revealed that the storm weakened to 125 mph (201 km/h) because the aforementioned wind speed was a gust rather than a sustained wind.

Fox weakened while moving northeastward and fell to Category 2 hurricane intensity by 18:00 UTC, at which time it made landfall on Bahia Honda Key, Florida, with winds of 105 mph (169 km/h). Continuing northeastward, the hurricane struck near Flamingo about two hours later at the same intensity. While passing near Miami early on October 6, Fox briefly weakened to a Category 1 hurricane. Shortly thereafter, it emerged into the Atlantic Ocean near Fort Lauderdale and quickly re-strengthened to a Category 2 hurricane. After brushing Grand Bahama island, the storm continued on its northeasterly trajectory into the open sea, until curving east-northward on October 7. Around 12:00 UTC, a ship observed a barometric pressure of 971 mbar (28.7 inHg), the lowest in relation to the cyclone. Ten hours later, Fox made landfall on Bermuda with winds of 105 mph (169 km/h). The storm fell to Category 1 early on October 8 and to tropical storm status after about 24 hours. Fox then meandered out in the central Atlantic for several days and executed a large cyclonic loop between October 11 and October 14. Fox turned northward on October 14 and began to accelerate. After curving northeastward, the storm transitioned into an extratropical cyclone early on October 16 while located about 535 mi (861 km) east-southeast of Cape Race, Newfoundland. The remnants were absorbed by a cold front several hours later.

== Impact ==
The storm brought strong winds to Cuba, with a wind gust of 132 mph (212 km/h) in Havana. The city suffered considerable damage, forcing police to patrol for looters. Nearly all of the city was left without electricity. In some portions of the neighborhood of Miramar, flooding was reported. Trees were felled onto Paseo del Prado, a famous street in Havana. In other parts of the city, falling trees and rubble also disrupted transportation. There were heavy crop losses in Havana and Pinar Del Rio provinces, where several rivers overflowed their banks. Homes and cattle were swept away by flash flooding. Overall, the hurricane left eleven fatalities, three of them due to houses collapsing on their occupants. Additionally, there were about 300 injuries and an estimated $6 million in damage. After the storm, Cuban President Ramón Grau, President-elect Carlos Prío Socarrás, and Major General Genovevo Pérez Dámera – Chief of Staff of the Army – assessed damage in the Havana area and developed plans for recovery.

The Hurricane Warning Service, operated by the United States Weather Bureau and the predecessor to the National Hurricane Center, issued hurricane warnings from Fort Myers to Miami, including the Florida Keys on October 4. Miami Weather Bureau chief Grady Norton urged residents to take precautions and concentrate on further advisories. On October 5, the hurricane warning was revised to include Naples to Jupiter. Additionally, other warnings were issued for areas surrounding Lake Okeechobee due to flooding concerns. Four U.S. Navy wartime housing project areas in Key West were evacuated. About 100 Seminoles fled the Brighton Seminole Indian Reservation, with 95% of the property still inundated from the September hurricane. Two 25-car trains evacuated about 5,000 people in the Lake Okeechobee area in Lake Harbor and transported them to Sebring. Many residents throughout South Florida boarded-up their windows and sandbagged their properties. The American Red Cross opened 143 shelters, which 21,663 people sought refuge in.

The hurricane, reminiscent of Hurricane Floyd in 1987, produced minimal damage in the Florida Keys. Strong winds were reported at some islands, with winds well over 100 mph (160 km/h) observed on Bahia Honda Key. At the Naval Air Station Key West on Boca Chica Key, several buildings were deroofed. The cyclone produced a storm surge of 4.5 ft (1.4 m) on Biscayne Bay. Rainfall exceeded 9.5 in (240 mm) at the Miami airport station, inundating many streets in the city and in Hialeah, Homestead, Miami Beach, Miami Springs. In Hialeah, the city mayor reported water depths of 3.5 ft (1.1 m) in the streets. A Miami bridge, located near the Miami River, was damaged by a loose barge during the hurricane. Planes were overturned and damaged by strong winds at the Tamiami Airport. Electrical outages occurred in Miami as power lines snapped due to the wind. In Miami Beach, a fire that broke out during the storm severely damaged a meat market and destroyed a photo shop. Prior to landfall, the hurricane produced three tornadoes, all of which attained the equivalence of F2 intensity on the modern Fujita scale. A tornado destroyed three homes in the city of Opa-locka, where damage reached $15,000. The tornado flipped cars and inflicted extensive damage at the Royal Palm dairy farm.

Another tornado touched down just south of Pompano Beach demolished 25 homes and left $100,000 in damage and seven injuries. Forty-four minutes later, a third tornado struck homes west of Fort Lauderdale. One building, containing two stories, lost its roof, while five homes incurred damage. Barns were damaged or destroyed. Losses reached $15,000. West Palm Beach observed wind gusts up to 62 mph (100 km/h). The hurricane caused no fatalities across the state, which the Weather Bureau considered unusual due to the storm's path over the densely populated Miami metropolitan area. The passage of hurricane in September, which had resulted in pre-existing damage, mitigated the destruction from the October hurricane. Overall, 36 homes were destroyed and 638 others suffered serious impact, while 45 buildings were demolished and 50 others experienced damage. Total losses in Florida reached $5.5 million, which included $3.5 million to property, $1.5 million to crops, $400,000 to electricity and communications, and $100,000 to roads.

In the Bahamas, wind gusts reached 110 mph (180 km/h) on Grand Bahama. Bermuda was also impacted by the hurricane, with strong winds blowing roofs off buildings, including a portion of the roof on the House of Assembly of Bermuda, and the sides of some structures were knocked down. Electrical light wires and telephone lines were down across the island. Kindley Air Force Base and the U.S. Naval Base received minimal damage. Damages exceeded $1 million.

== See also ==
- List of Bermuda hurricanes
- List of Florida hurricanes
