= 1883 Atlantic hurricane season =

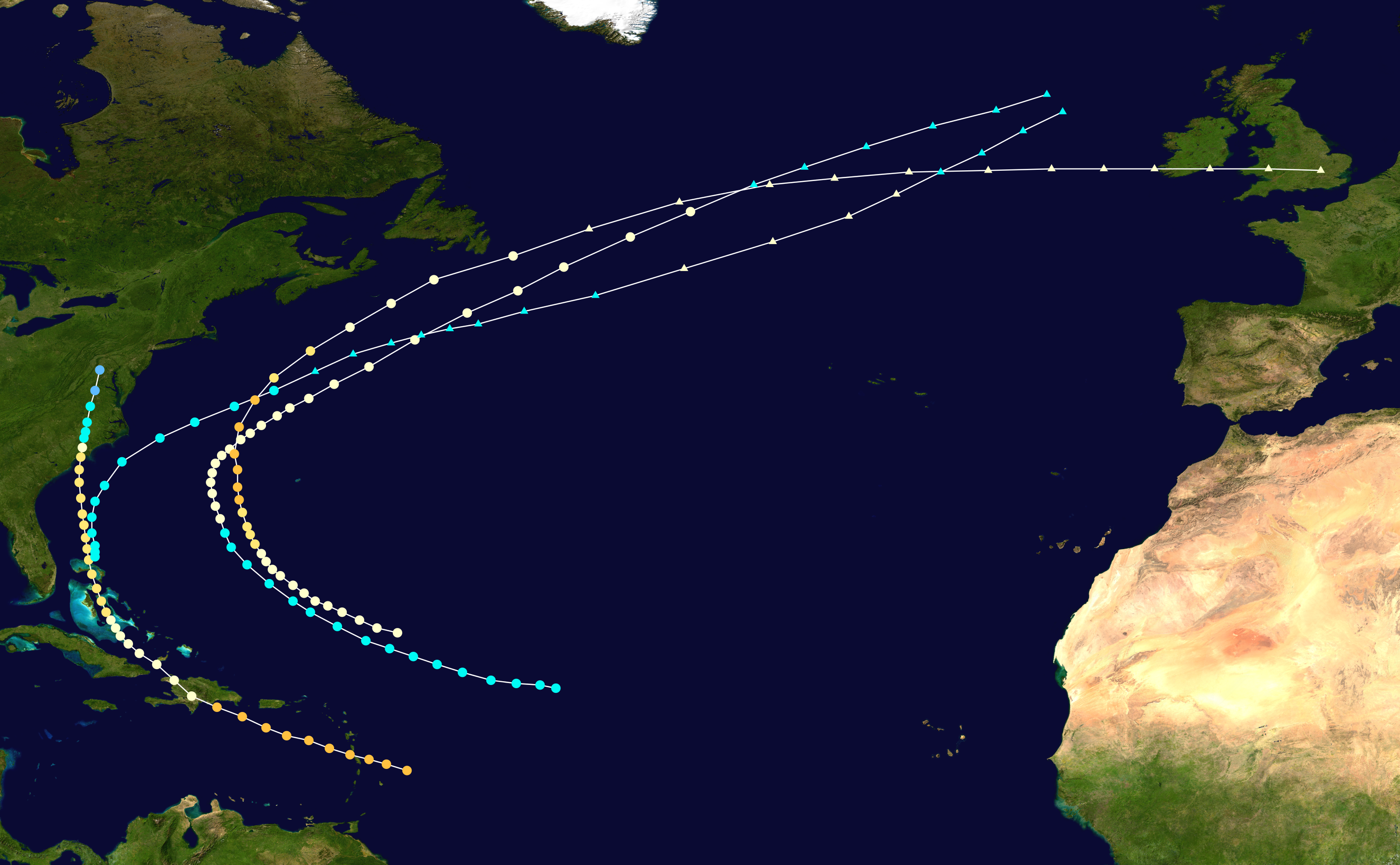
- Season summary map

Seasonal boundaries
- First system formed: August 18, 1883
- Last system dissipated: October 24, 1883

Strongest storm
- Name: Two
  - Maximum winds: 125 mph (205 km/h) (1-minute sustained)
  - Lowest pressure: 948 mbar (hPa; 27.99 inHg)

Seasonal statistics
- Total storms: 4
- Hurricanes: 3
- Major hurricanes (Cat. 3+): 2
- Total fatalities: 305
- Total damage: > $520,000 (1883 USD)

The 1883 Atlantic hurricane season featured only four known tropical cyclones, though three of them (or their extratropical remnants) caused fatalities. Of the four storms, three of them strengthened into hurricanes, while two of those intensified into a major hurricane. (Note: A major hurricane is a storm that ranks as Category 3 or higher on the Saffir–Simpson hurricane wind scale.) However, in the absence of modern satellite and other remote-sensing technologies, only storms that affected populated land areas or encountered ships at sea were recorded, so the actual total could be higher. An exclusion of zero to six tropical cyclones per year between 1851 and 1885 and zero to four per year between 1886 and 1910 has been estimated.

Reanalysis by meteorologists José Fernández-Partagás and Henry F. Diaz in 1996 and the Atlantic hurricane reanalysis project in the early 21st century did not add or remove any systems from the official hurricane database (HURDAT). However, both modified the tracks of tropical cyclones. More recently, climate researcher Michael Chenoweth authored a reanalysis study, published in 2014, which concluded that the 1883 season featured a total of six tropical cyclones. This included the removal of the fourth system and the addition of four previously undocumented storms, for a net gain of three cyclones. Chenoweth also proposed some alterations to the track and intensity of each storm, but these changes have yet to be incorporated into HURDAT.

The season's first system was initially detected over the Atlantic Ocean on August 18 to the east-northeast of the Lesser Antilles. Although the storm never made landfall, it killed at least 80 people over the Grand Banks of Newfoundland before transitioning into an extratropical cyclone on August 27. Later that month, another system did not make landfall as a tropical cyclone. However, the powerful extratropical remnants crossed the British Isles in early September, causing eighteen deaths in England, one in Ireland, and at least one offshore France, due to maritime incidents. The season's third system passed near Martinique and struck the Dominican Republic, the Bahamas, and North Carolina, all at hurricane intensity, resulting in more than $520,000 (1883 USD) in damage and 206 fatalities. (Note: All damage figures are in 1883 USD, unless otherwise noted) The fourth and final cyclone became extratropical about halfway between Bermuda and Nova Scotia on October 24. Overall, the storms of the season collectively killed more than 305 people.

== Season summary ==
The Atlantic hurricane database (HURDAT) recognizes four tropical cyclones for the 1883 season. Of the four systems, three intensified into a hurricane, while two of those strengthened into a major hurricane. José Fernández-Partagás and Henry F. Diaz did not add or remove any cyclones from their 1996 reanalysis, but modified the tracks of all four storms. In the early 21st century, the Atlantic hurricane reanalysis project also did not increase or decrease the number of storms and made few significant changes from Fernández-Partagás and Diaz. A reanalysis by climate researcher Michael Chenoweth, published in 2014, adds four storms while removing the fourth HURDAT system. Chenoweth's study utilizes a more extensive collection of newspapers and ship logs, as well as late 19th century weather maps for the first time, in comparison to previous reanalysis projects. However, Chenoweth's proposals have yet to be incorporated into HURDAT.

HURDAT begins the track of the first known system east-northeast of the Lesser Antilles on August 18. The storm strengthened and peaked as a strong Category 1 hurricane on the present-day Saffir–Simpson scale, before becoming extratropical on August 27 east of Newfoundland. August proved to be the most active month of the season, with another cyclone first observed northeast of the Lesser Antilles on August 24. This storm became the most intense of the season, peaking as a Category 3 hurricane with maximum sustained winds of 125 mph (205 km/h) and an atmospheric pressure of 948 mbar (28.0 inHg). It also did not make landfall, but the extratropical remnants crossed the British Isles. September featured a cyclone nearly as an intense, the third system, which passed near Martinique and struck the Dominican Republic, the Bahamas, and North Carolina, all at hurricane intensity. The last known cyclone was a tropical storm that passed near the coast of North Carolina prior to becoming extratropical about halfway between Bermuda and Nova Scotia on October 24. Collectively, the storms of the 1883 season caused at least 305 deaths and more than $520,000 in damage, the latter figure entirely associated with the third system.

The season's activity was reflected with an accumulated cyclone energy (ACE) rating of 67, more than the previous two seasons despite featuring fewer tropical storms. ACE is a metric used to express the energy used by a tropical cyclone during its lifetime. Therefore, a storm with a longer duration will have higher values of ACE. It is only calculated at six-hour increments in which specific tropical and subtropical systems are either at or above sustained wind speeds of 39 mph (63 km/h), which is the threshold for tropical storm intensity. Thus, tropical depressions are not included here.

== Systems ==
=== Hurricane One ===
- Category 1 hurricane (SSHWS)
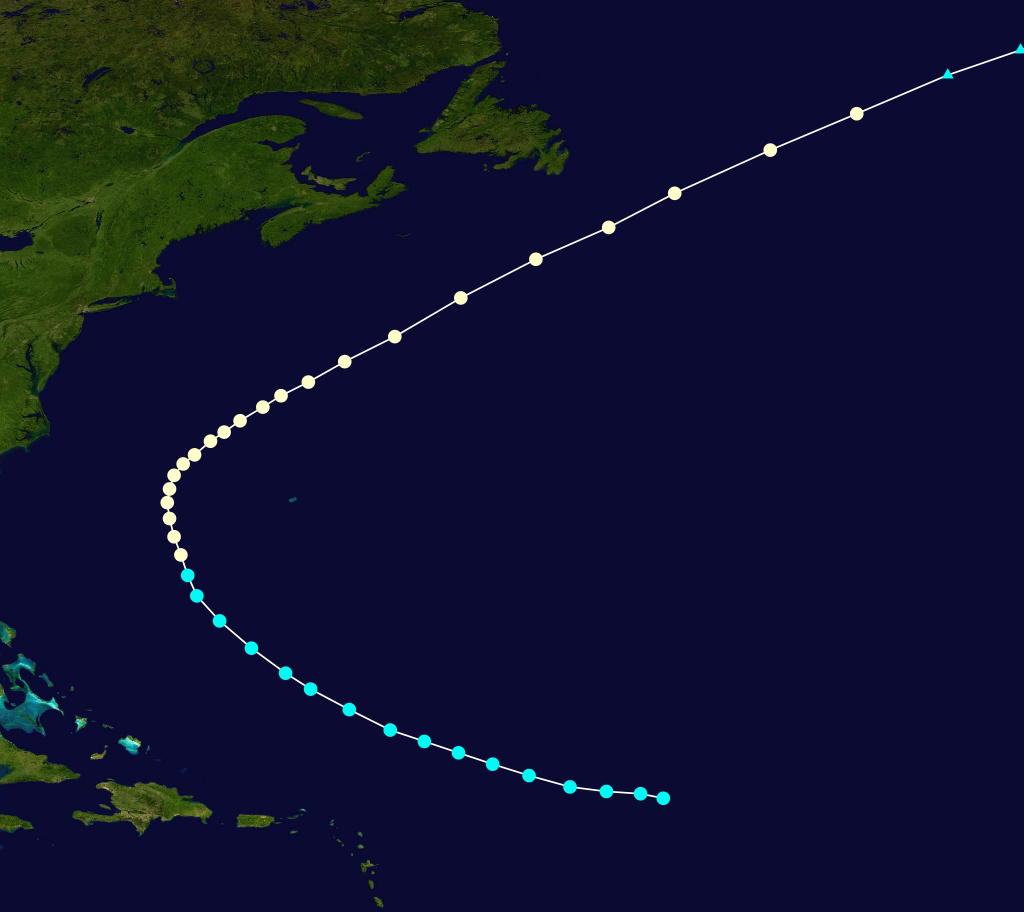
- Duration: August 18 – August 27
- Peak intensity: 90 mph (150 km/h) (1-min); 975 mbar (hPa)

The Atlantic hurricane database (HURDAT) begins the track for this cyclone about 850 mi (1,370 km) east-northeast of the Leeward Islands on August 18, one day before being encountered by the bark B. F. Watson. Initially a tropical storm, the system moved on a west-northwestward path that gradually became more northwestward. Late on August 21, the storm turned north-northwestward and intensified into a hurricane early the next day while situated southwest of Bermuda. The cyclone then turned northeastward on August 23 and continued to slowly strengthen. Late on August 26, the ship Finchley observed a barometric pressure of 975 mbar (28.8 inHg), the lowest associated with the storm. Consequently, the Atlantic hurricane reanalysis project estimated in 2003 that the hurricane peaked with maximum sustained winds of 90 mph (150 km/h). However, the hurricane lost tropical characteristics and on August 27, it transitioned into an extratropical cyclone about 775 mi (1,245 km) northeast of Newfoundland. The extratropical cyclone dissipated northwest of the British Isles on August 28.

The hurricane wreaked havoc on ships over the Grand Banks of Newfoundland. According to a September 1 report in The New York Times, 100 dories were lost and a total of 80 deaths occurred, though The Times of London noted on September 6 that 30 vessels remained missing. The latter also declared that "immense damage has been done to shipping." Climate researcher Michael Chenoweth's reanalysis study, published in 2014, extended the duration of this storm back two days earlier and theorized that it became a hurricane on August 18. The cyclone also maintained major hurricane status late on August 25 and into the following day, based on an estimated barometric pressure of 941 mbar (27.8 inHg).

=== Hurricane Two ===
- Category 3 hurricane (SSHWS)
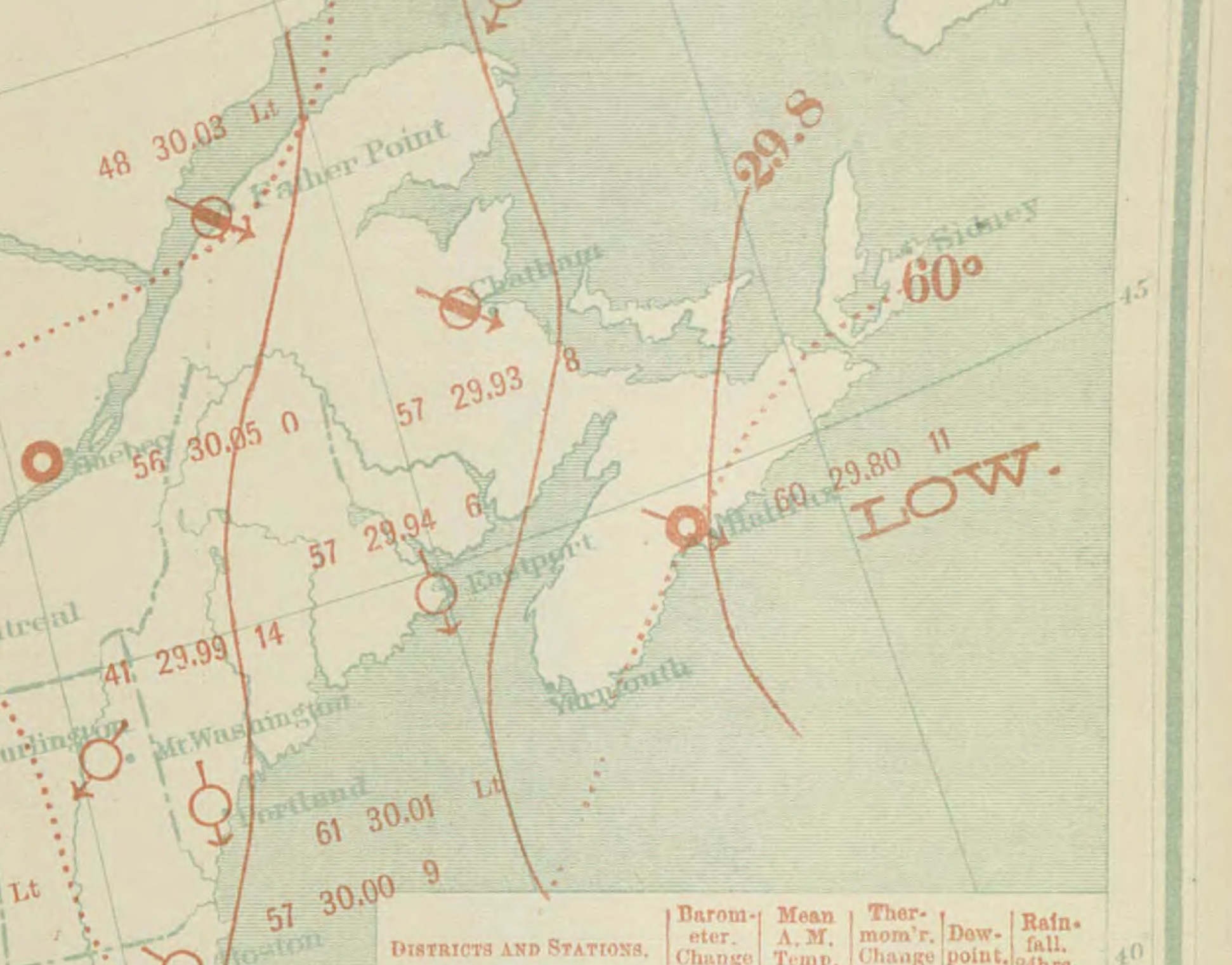
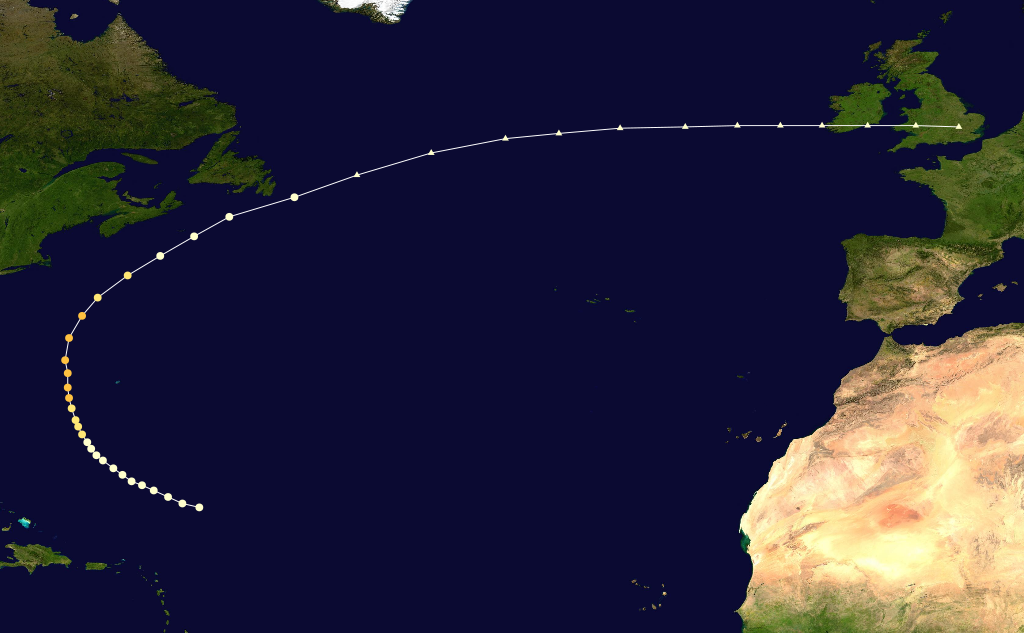
- Duration: August 24 – August 30
- Peak intensity: 125 mph (205 km/h) (1-min); ≤948 mbar (hPa)

On August 24, the bark N. Boynton encountered a hurricane to the northeast of the Leeward Islands, with the official track initiated about 400 mi (640 km) from Barbuda. This storm moved on a similar path to the previous, trekking west-northwestward and then northwestward, followed by a turn to the north on August 27. Intensification occurred during this time, and early the next day, the cyclone reached major hurricane status, becoming a Category 3 hurricane on the present-day Saffir–Simpson scale while passing west of Bermuda. A brig known as Daphne observed a barometric pressure of 948 mbar (28.0 inHg) on August 29. Based on this, the Atlantic hurricane reanalysis project estimated that this storm attained peak winds of 125 mph (205 km/h). The storm then turned northeastward and gradually weakened. Late on August 30, the system passed near Newfoundland as a Category 1 hurricane and soon transitioned into an extratropical cyclone. The extratropical storm persisted until September 2, when it struck the British Isles at hurricane-equivalent intensity and lost its identity over East Anglia.

The hurricane generated sustained winds up to 40 mph (64 km/h) on Bermuda. In Nova Scotia, strong winds impacted Halifax, where two yachts and a number of other vessels became stranded or capsized. The extratropical remnants brought abnormally high tides to Ireland, flooding low-lying homes in the town of Wexford. At least one person died after the steamer Iris capsized at Inishtrahull island. Crops, especially grain, suffered extensive damage in southern Ireland, leading to concerns about the renewal of rent agitation. In Great Britain, barometers fell to as low as 963 mbar (28.4 inHg) at Pembroke, Wales. Several vessels capsized, especially along the south coast of England, causing twelve deaths from the G. J. Jones (or G I. Jones), two from the Christiana, and one from an unnamed vessel at Padstow, while the rough seas swept one person off the Ajax. Two other people drowned at Mount Batten. Waves swept away nearly 0.5 mi (0.80 km) of the Portland Branch Railway. However, the storm also caused some waterways to fall to abnormally low tides, interfering with boat traffic on the River Thames. The extratropical cyclone also impacted France, Germany, and Norway. In France, one ship at Bayonne and several others near Bordeaux capsized, "with loss of hands" in the vicinity of the latter according to The Times. One person on the Cartago Nova was swept overboard and drowned in the Bay of Biscay.

Chenoweth initiates the track for this storm as a tropical depression about halfway between the Lesser Antilles and Cabo Verde Islands on August 20. The system reaches tropical storm intensity on August 21 and then hurricane status late the next day. Chenoweth also proposed a more northeasterly track of the extratropical cyclone across the British Isles, before it dissipated over the North Sea on September 3.

=== Hurricane Three ===
- Category 3 hurricane (SSHWS)
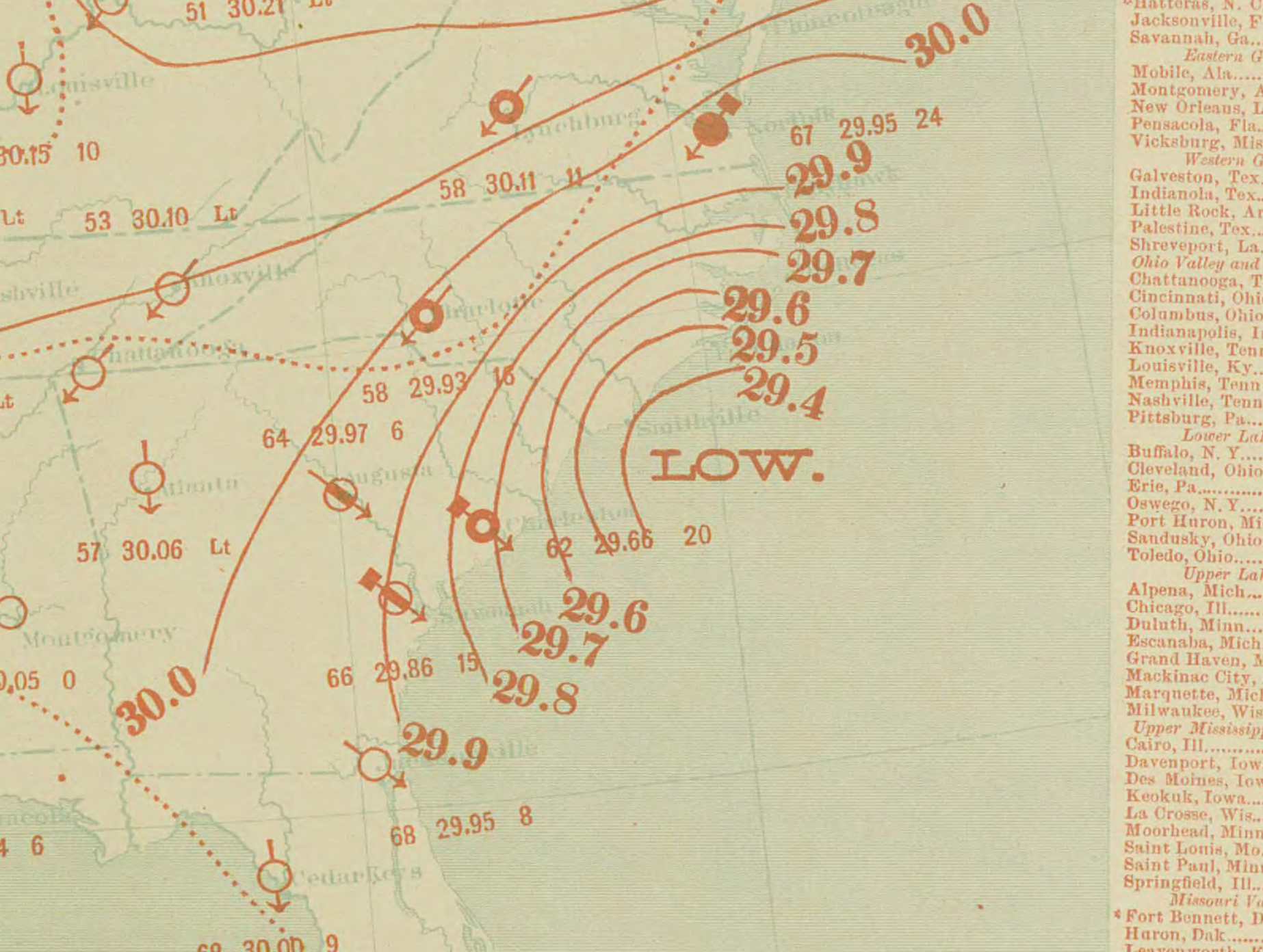
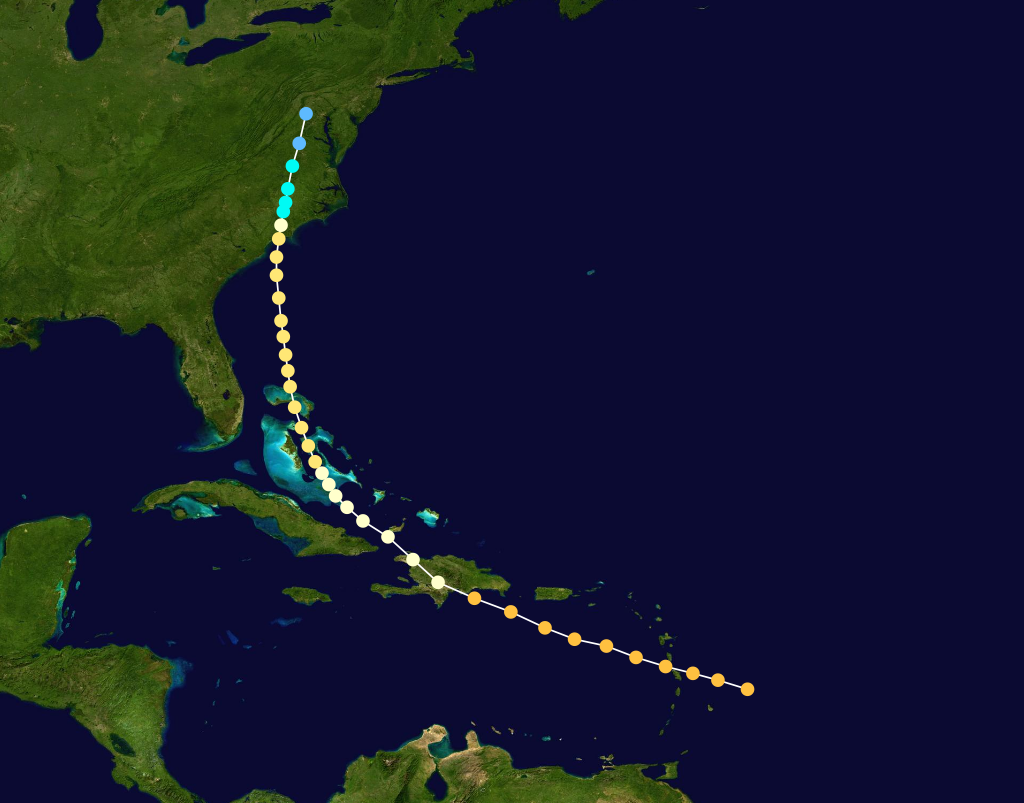
- Duration: September 4 – September 13
- Peak intensity: 125 mph (205 km/h) (1-min); 955 mbar (hPa)

The Bahamas-North Carolina Hurricane of 1883

The brig L. W. Armstrong experienced heavy rains, high seas, and barometric pressures as low as 955 mbar (28.2 inHg) at Saint-Pierre, Martinique, on September 4, one day after reporting no unusual weather. Consequently, HURDAT begins the track for this storm as a Category 3 hurricane with winds of 125 mph (205 km/h) early on September 4 about 115 mi (185 km) northeast of Barbados. Several hours later, the cyclone passed just north of Martinique as it moved west-northwestward into the Caribbean Sea. Early on September 6, the hurricane made landfall near Barahona, Dominican Republic, and likely rapidly weakened to a Category 1 hurricane over the mountainous terrain of Hispaniola. Emerging into the Atlantic from Haiti's northwest coast, the system trekked northwestward through the Bahamas and re-intensified into a Category 2 on September 8. After passing near New Providence that day, the storm then moved near or over the Abaco Islands and Grand Bahama on September 9. The hurricane then moved generally northward, and on September 11, it made landfall just east of the South Carolina-North Carolina state line. Thereafter, the cyclone trekked north-northeastward and weakened to a tropical storm early on September 12 and then to a tropical depression about 24 hours later, before dissipating over Maryland on September 13.

On Martinique, the hurricane damaged many vessels and plantations and some huts and homes. Three deaths occurred after ships sank. Several other islands experienced impacts due to the hurricane, particularly Dominica, with the Bristol Mercury reporting that damage on the island totaled "not less than £100,000" (nearly $482,000). Along the coast of the Dominican Republic, Captain C. O. Davis estimated that perhaps more than 100 people drowned within 8 mi (13 km) of Santo Domingo. Many villages lining the country's south coast suffered extensive impact, with damage reaching approximately $30,000. In the Bahamas, the hurricane left few homes undamaged in Nassau and toppled many fences, walls, and trees. The Nassau Guardian reported that almost 100 ships sustained serious damage or capsized and that the storm killed approximately 50 people. Across North Carolina, the hurricane toppled trees, fences, light buildings, and telegraph and telephone lines. Several vessels were wrecked off the North Carolina coast and flooding occurred along the Cape Fear River. Smithville (present-day Southport) reported $8,000-$10,000 in damage, although this figure likely did not include many of the vessels capsized there. A total of 53 deaths occurred in North Carolina. Rains from this storm in Virginia helped end a summer-long drought but any benefit was minimal, as the peanut crop had already failed from the lack of precipitation. At Nottoway, heavy rain from the cyclone may have led to a train with 10 freight cars derailing.

A reanalysis study by Chenoweth initiated the track for this storm as a tropical depression to the southwest of the Cabo Verde Islands on September 2. The depression moved generally northwestward and strengthened into a tropical storm later that day and a hurricane by September 4. Chenoweth argues that the cyclone weakened to a tropical storm early on September 7 due to its passage over Hispaniola, before becoming a hurricane again several hours later. Additionally, Chenoweth theorizes that the cyclone held major hurricane status for a second stint over the Bahamas on September 9.

=== Tropical Storm Four ===
- Tropical storm (SSHWS)
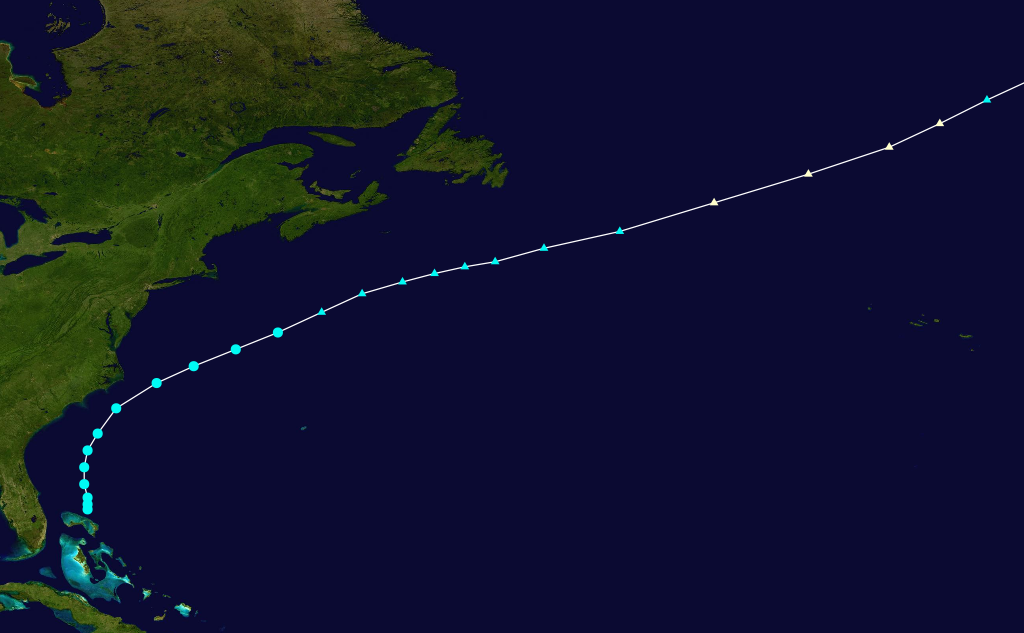
- Duration: October 22 – October 24
- Peak intensity: 60 mph (95 km/h) (1-min);

On October 22, the schooners Etna and Mahaska encountered this storm offshore South Carolina, leading to the track beginning on that date just north of the Abaco Islands in the Bahamas. The storm initially moved to the north, before curving northeastward by the following day. Only slight intensification likely occurred, with the system peaking with winds of 60 mph (95 km/h) early on October 24. Several hours later, however, the storm transitioned into an extratropical cyclone about halfway between Bermuda and Nova Scotia. Before dissipating northwest of Ireland on October 28, the extratropical remnants reached hurricane-equivalent intensity over the northern Atlantic, based on the ship Rhaetia recording sustained winds of 81 mph (130 km/h) and a minimum barometric pressure of 983 mbar (29.0 inHg).

A few locations in New England observed tropical-storm force sustained winds, such as 58 mph (93 km/h) at Buzzards Bay, Massachusetts. Chenoweth proposed the removal of this storm from HURDAT as part of his reanalysis study, published in 2014, noting "Insufficient supporting evidence from other neighboring data sources."

=== Other storms ===
Chenoweth proposed four other storms not currently listed in HURDAT. The first such storm formed over the northwestern Caribbean on September 16. Moving generally west-northward, the system made landfall near Tulum, Quintana Roo, early on September 20. After emerging into the Bay of Campeche about 24 hours later, the cyclone turned southwestward and struck near Paraíso, Tabasco, on September 22, shortly before dissipating. Around the same time that the previous storm developed, another system formed on September 16 just southwest of the Cabo Verde Islands. This storm headed generally northwestward through September 20, before tracking in a more northeastward direction. Late the following day, the system transitioned into an extratropical cyclone northwest of the Azores. On October 6, another proposed storm formed southeast of Bermuda. After passing just south of the island late on October 9, the cyclone moved generally westward until becoming extratropical offshore South Carolina on October 12. Chenoweth's fourth and final proposed system formed northeast of the Lesser Antilles on December 8. The storm moved southward through the following day, when it turned westward, but then the cyclone turned northeastward on December 10. Late on December 11, the cyclone dissipated southeast of Bermuda.

== Season effects ==
This is a table of all of the known storms that have formed in the 1883 Atlantic hurricane season. It includes their duration, landfall, damages, and death totals. Deaths in parentheses are additional and indirect (an example of an indirect death would be a traffic accident), but were still related to that storm. Damage and deaths include totals while the storm was extratropical, a wave, or a low, and all of the damage figures are in 1883 USD.

Saffir–Simpson scale
TD	TS	C1	C2	C3	C4	C5

1883 North Atlantic tropical cyclone season statistics
Storm name	Dates active	Storm category at peak intensity	Max 1-min wind mph (km/h)	Min. press. (mbar)	Areas affected	Damage (US$)	Deaths	Ref(s).
One	August 18–27	Category 1 hurricane	90 (150)	975	Grand Banks of Newfoundland	Unknown	80	
Two	August 24–30	Category 3 hurricane	125 (205)	≤948	Bermuda, Atlantic Canada, British Isles, France, Germany, Norway	Unknown	>19	
Three	September 4–13	Category 3 hurricane	125 (205)	955	Lesser Antilles, Greater Antilles (the Dominican Republic), the Bahamas, East Coast of the United States (North Carolina)	>$520,000	206	
Four	October 22–24	Tropical storm	60 (95)	Unknown	East Coast of the United States	Unknown	None	
Season aggregates
4 systems	August 18 – October 24		125 (205)	≤948		>$520,000	>305	

== See also ==
- Atlantic hurricane
- Atlantic hurricane reanalysis project
- Tropical cyclone observation
