= 1941 Florida hurricane =

Category 3 Atlantic hurricane in 1941

- A daily weather map for October 6, 1941, depicting the hurricane approaching southeast Florida

Meteorological history
- Formed: October 3, 1941
- Extratropical: October 11
- Dissipated: October 13, 1941

Category 3 major hurricane
- 1-minute sustained (SSHWS/NWS)
- Highest winds: 120 mph (195 km/h)
- Lowest pressure: 962 mbar (hPa); 28.41 inHg

Overall effects
- Fatalities: 10+ total
- Damage: $675,000 (1941 USD)
- Areas affected: Bahamas, Florida, Southeast United States
- IBTrACS /
- Part of the 1941 Atlantic hurricane season

The 1941 Florida hurricane was a compact but strong tropical cyclone that affected the Bahamas, Florida, and the southeastern United States in October 1941. The fifth known storm of the 1941 Atlantic hurricane season, it was first observed to the north of the Virgin Islands on October 3. The storm tracked generally westward, reaching peak winds of 120 miles per hour (193 km/h) before passing through the Bahamas. (Note: These wind speeds correspond to a Category 3 hurricane on the modern-day Saffir–Simpson Hurricane Scale, which did not exist at the time of this storm.) After weakening somewhat, the storm later passed across southern Florida with winds of 100 mph (161 km/h). The hurricane then emerged into the Gulf of Mexico as a tropical storm, but regained hurricane intensity and made another landfall along the Florida Panhandle. Turning northeast, it crossed Georgia and South Carolina, and entered the Atlantic Ocean on October 8.

In advance of the storm, preparations were extensive; residents boarded up homes and businesses, while evacuations were recommended in some coastal areas. In the Bahamas, where winds reached 104 mph (167 km/h), the storm killed three people. The city of Nassau was struck particularly hard. In Florida, damage was relatively severe, and included the deaths of several people. High winds brought down trees and power lines, though the storm was characterized by highly unusual rainfall patterns. In the Everglades region, a storm surge flooded local streets. As the storm progressed northward, the city of Tallahassee suffered widespread power outages and damage to numerous vehicles. Throughout the state, the hurricane inflicted US$675,000 ($14.8 million 2024 USD) in damage. The cyclone later killed one person in Georgia.

== Meteorological history ==
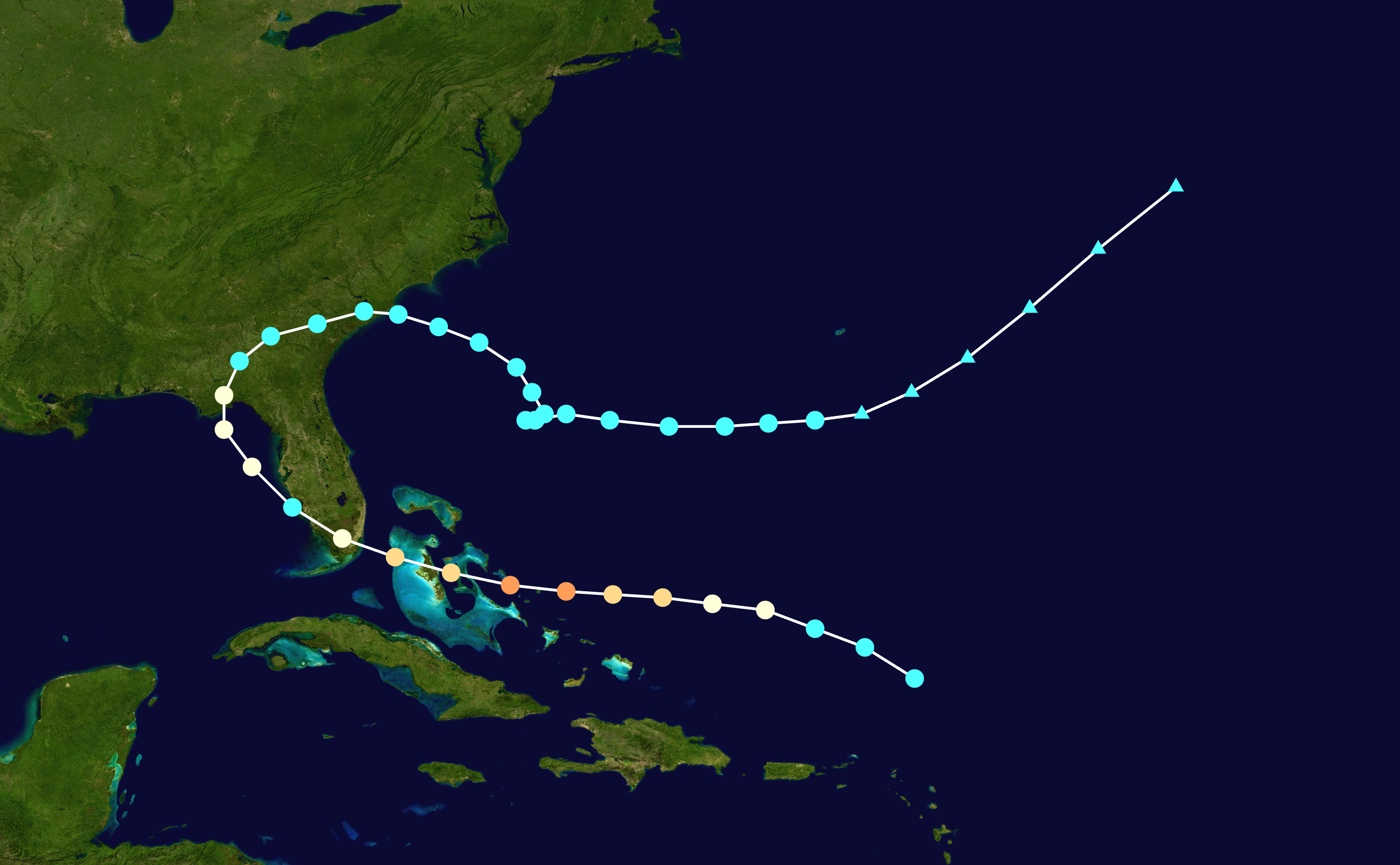
Map plotting the storm's track and intensity, according to the Saffir–Simpson scale Map key Saffir–Simpson scale Tropical depression (≤38 mph, ≤62 km/h) Tropical storm (39–73 mph, 63–118 km/h) Category 1 (74–95 mph, 119–153 km/h) Category 2 (96–110 mph, 154–177 km/h) Category 3 (111–129 mph, 178–208 km/h) Category 4 (130–156 mph, 209–251 km/h) Category 5 (≥157 mph, ≥252 km/h) Unknown Storm type Tropical cyclone Subtropical cyclone Extratropical cyclone, remnant low, tropical disturbance, or monsoon depression

On October 3, the first indications of a tropical system were observed 300 miles (483 km) to the north of the Virgin Islands. A tropical storm is estimated to have been present late that day, though observations were very sparse near the cyclone. The next day, morning observations confirmed the presence of a circulation center, and soon afterward the cyclone underwent rapid intensification: it became a hurricane late that day, and 24 hours later, on October 5, the storm reached a peak of 120 mph (193 km/h)—equivalent to a modern-day Category 3 hurricane on the Saffir-Simpson hurricane wind scale. Shortly afterward, the smaller-than-average, fast-moving cyclone tracked over Cat Island in the Bahamas, where a weather station indicated a pressure of 28.48 inches of mercury (964 mb) inside the eye. The measurement coincided with light winds of 20 mph (32 km/h), meaning it was not in the exact center of the eye, so a recent reanalysis found the central pressure to be somewhat lower, at 962 mb (28.41 inHg). After striking Cat Island, the cyclone began a weakening trend and passed south of New Providence, seat of the Bahamian capital Nassau, early on October 6. At the time, the storm was still found to be a compact, well-developed hurricane.

Later that day, it made landfall 13 mi (21 km) south of Miami in South Florida; observers reported that the small eye produced calm conditions at Goulds, near Homestead. The storm contained peak winds of 100 mph (161 km/h)—equivalent to low-end Category 2 status—and a radius of maximum wind just 10 mi (16 km) from the center. Originally, the Atlantic hurricane database (HURDAT) listed winds of 120 mph (193 km/h) at landfall in South Florida, but reanalysis determined that these winds occurred somewhat earlier, over the eastern Bahamas. Maintaining a small size, the hurricane moved through the Everglades, passing between Everglades City and Fort Myers. The storm entered the Gulf of Mexico as a strong tropical storm and broadly curved toward the northwest, tracking offshore along the west coast of Florida. It remained over open waters and recovered its intensity until the following day, when it made landfall at Carrabelle with winds of 90 mph (145 km/h), equivalent to a high-end Category 1 hurricane, and a measured central pressure of 29 inHg (982 mb). The cyclone still exhibited a small radius of outermost closed isobar but had reduced its forward speed.

Turning north and then northeast, the storm moved beyond Tallahassee and entered Georgia. It weakened as it progressed inland, and after passing through South Carolina, the storm re-emerged into the Atlantic Ocean on October 8 with winds of 40 mph (64 km/h). While over water, the storm re-intensified, reaching peak winds of 60 mph (97 km/h) on October 9. The cyclone kept its intensity for two more days as it moved toward the southeast, executed a small loop, and turned generally toward the east-northeast, passing south of Bermuda on the night of October 11. The storm became extratropical on October 12, fully dissipating the next day.

== Preparations ==
In one downtown office building, more than a score of children of all ages had the time of their lives. Their parents—weary from putting their homes in order before going downtown—tried vainly to get them to sleep on desks softened by sofa cushions.

— The Vidette-Messenger, October 6, 1941

During the days before the storm's arrival in Florida, the Weather Bureau issued 40 tropical cyclone-related advisories. Extensive preparations that resulted in a low loss of life and property were attributed to the warnings. In southern Florida, residents boarded up homes and businesses, and sought shelter in large structures. Hurricane parties took place in bars and hotel rooms, while some residents sat in hotel lobbies, listening to radio broadcasts. In Miami, stores sold out of various essentials—including bread and butter—as people prepared for the storm. Evacuations were recommended from Homestead to Key West, and three Coast Guard planes dropped warnings to boats near the Florida coast. The Civilian Conservation Corps also evacuated 150 of its workers from West Summerland Key to Key West.

Local chapters of the American Red Cross organized first-aid stations and shelters; transportation was provided to those who were unable to reach the shelters. In advance of the storm, Pan American World Airways suspended flights departing from and arriving at Miami and redirected them to Havana, Cuba. The United States Navy also prepared its bases in the Florida Keys for the arrival of the storm by securing boats to piers and canceling all shore leaves, while the United States Army Air Corps moved its planes from Morrison Field to a safer location inland. The state of Florida stockpiled food for those affected by the storm, establishing depots in West Palm Beach, Miami, and Fort Myers, and the Governor of Florida, Spessard Holland, ordered state agencies to prepare for relief work. A detachment of officers from the Florida Highway Patrol was sent to Miami and patrolled along highways to provide gasoline to motorists evacuating the storm. The state also opened all of the school buildings in Dade County as emergency shelters.

== Impact ==
=== Bahamas ===
In the Bahamas, where considerable property damage was reported, the storm killed three people. Winds in Nassau reached 104 mph (167 km/h). City streets were filled with debris, including a schooner, four sloops, and numerous other boats deposited by the winds on Nassau's Bay Street. The winds knocked down trees and power lines, resulting in fires and extensive power outages. Along the coast, boats were ripped from their moorings and smashed against seawalls. No casualties occurred in the city. A schooner, the Goodwill II, sank during the storm. Properties and gardens received significant damage. On Cat Island, the storm produced 1.62 inches (40 mm) of rainfall.

Two men, Christopher Whymss and Salathiel Johnson, drowned near Andros Island after trying to reach shore from a drowning schooner. One man, Samuel Seymour, was killed on Cat Island after his home was toppled by the wind, and several other injuries were reported on the island. "Most homes, all churches, and most public buildings" on Cat Island were also destroyed by the storm. The storm also downed telephone lines and destroyed crops. As a result, the Duke of Windsor, governor-general of the Bahamas, cabled to the Red Cross for assistance, and a ship carrying "food, clothing, building materials and seeds" was quickly dispatched to Cat Island. According to a survey conducted a few days after the hurricane, 300 families on Cat Island were left homeless as were 120 families on Watlings Island. To aid these families, the Duke of Windsor announced on October 7 that he would establish a relief fund for those affected by the storm.

=== United States ===
Map of Florida marking the area first affected

On making landfall, the storm generated high winds at the Fowey Rocks Light, although they were below hurricane force. A peak wind gust of 123 mph (198 km/h) was reported at Dinner Key with sustained winds up to 90 mph (145 km/h). Unusually little rain fell in association with the storm; 0.35 inches (8.9 mm) of precipitation was reported in Miami, while locations closer to the center of the cyclone received less than 1 inch (25 mm). The light rainfall was evident throughout southeastern Florida, except for the Florida Keys, where thunderstorms enhanced the precipitation. This aspect of the storm was considered highly unusual, as most tropical cyclones are characterized by heavy rainfall. According to one study, the unusual precipitation patterns can be attributed to one of two possible conditions: "the air might have been too dry", or "the horizontal convergence of air might have been insufficient to produce a large enough transport of moisture upwards". The intense winds blew salt water several miles inland; due to the lack of rainfall, the salt burned vegetation throughout the region. The high winds brought down trees and utility poles and shattered some windows in Dade County.

No deaths were reported in the region, although minor damage was inflicted on communication lines and homes and several injuries were reported. Several communities lost electricity. Some hospitals were left without power, forcing the delivery of six babies by candlelight. The storm injured seven people in the Miami area, including five firefighters who were injured "as they fought a blaze fanned by the high winds" of the hurricane. As the hurricane tracked inland, it passed over the Everglades, producing winds of 65 mph (105 km/h) at Everglades City. Along the southern shore of Lake Okeechobee, winds gusted to 60 mph (97 km/h); barometric pressure there fell to 995 mb (29.38 inHg). Storm surge in the region triggered foot-deep flooding of some streets in local towns. Docks and fishing equipment suffered extensive damage in the region. As the hurricane passed offshore, winds reached 60 mph (97 km/h) near Tampa Bay. The storm also grounded a fishing schooner from Cuba off the coast of Collier County, Florida. Although no one was injured, members of the schooner crew were detained by immigration authorities.

A Cuban schooner washed ashore by the storm.

After emerging into the Gulf of Mexico, the hurricane made another landfall at Carrabelle on the Florida Panhandle. Winds in the region were estimated at 75 mph (121 km/h), and tides ran at up to 8 feet (2.4 m) above normal. In Tallahassee, the winds downed trees and power lines and scattered debris, rendering roads impassable. The Tallahassee Democrat reported that "at the height of the wind several hundred Tallahasseeans were seen rushing into their yard to gather pecans which were knocked down by the swaying trees". The storm destroyed vehicles throughout the region; replacement automobiles were sparse, as assembly plants were producing cars for the Army. (Note: Two months after the storm, in December 1941, the United States entered World War II and new vehicles became unavailable, forcing residents to resort to horse-drawn carriages for transportation. See Barnes, p. 163) Despite a lack of electricity due to the winds, the Tallahassee Democrat managed to publish 6,000 copies of a special storm edition. Initial fears of severe damage along the coast prompted rescue crews to push toward St. Marks; however, upon arrival a group of local residents convinced the crew that their assistance was unnecessary. Considerable crop and property damage was reported; total losses in the state were estimated at US$675,000 ($14.8 million in today's terms). (Note: Although the damage from the storm was relatively light, Roger A. Pielke, Jr. and Christopher Landsea estimated that if the hurricane had hit in 1992, it would have caused $5 billion in damages, due to changes in population density and home construction.) Seven injuries were reported, and five men drowned in the storm tide at a fishing net drying yard in Panacea, Florida. Initially, there were reports of 20 missing fishermen. 34 Cuban fishermen were also trapped off the coast near Carrabelle when 10 boats ran aground and were damaged after the storm surge subsided. The fishermen's supply of food was destroyed by salt water, but they were rescued by the Coast Guard cutter Nemesis without any injuries. After their rescue, they reported that five men had drowned in a small boat nearby.

The storm was still producing high wind gusts as it tracked into Georgia, killing one person and leaving a trail of considerable damage as far north as Albany. The single death in Georgia was a 16-year-old girl, Frances Hester, of Pavo, Georgia, who died after tripping over an electrical wire downed by the storm. Up to 6 inches (150 mm) of rain fell within the state. The storm passed through South Carolina with little damage. Throughout parts of the southeastern United States, rainfall associated with the hurricane was unusually light and unevenly distributed along its track.

== See also ==
- List of Florida hurricanes
- List of United States hurricanes
