= 1935 Yankee hurricane =

Category 2 Atlantic hurricane

Hurricane Seven
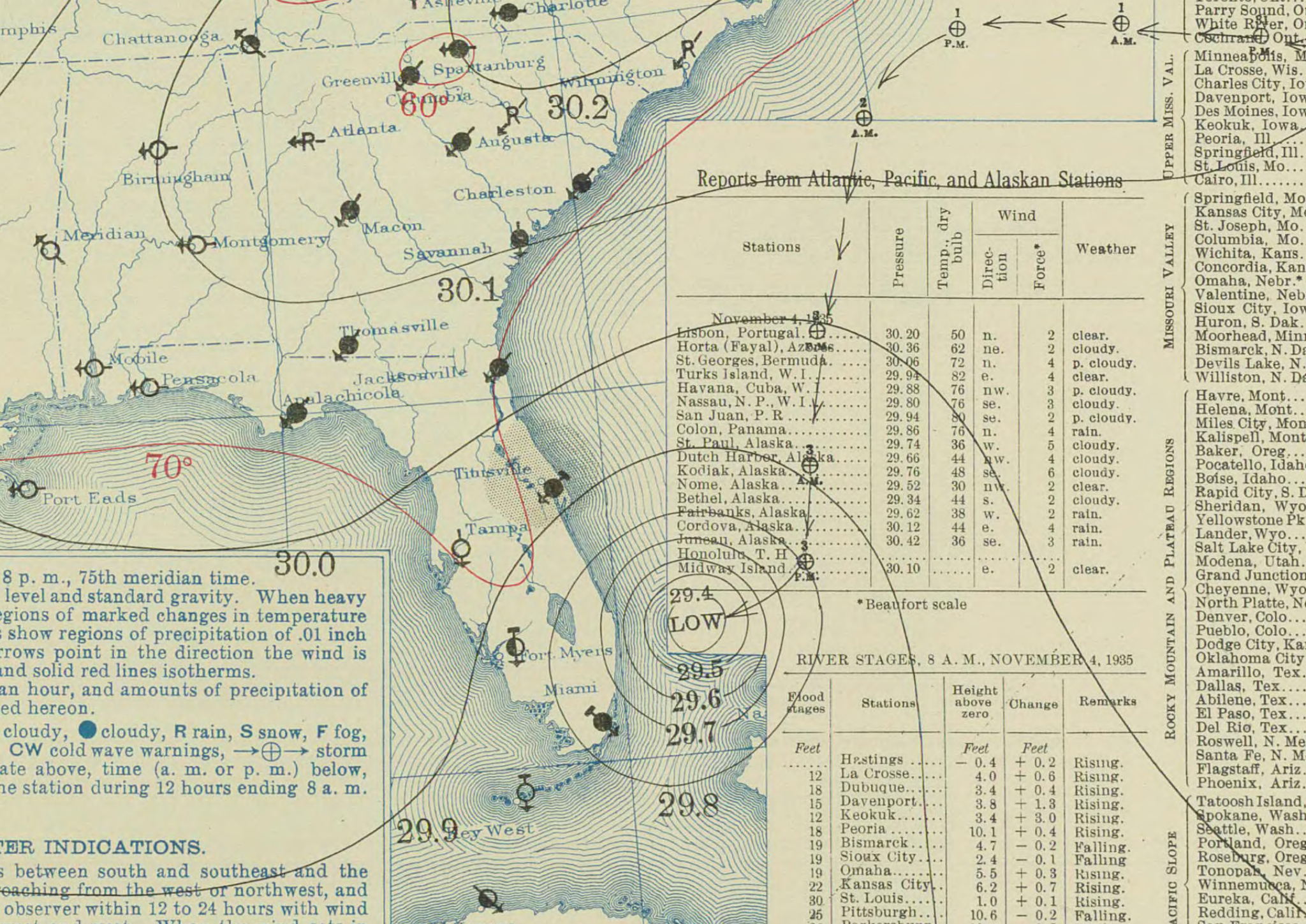
- Surface weather analysis of the storm nearing South Florida on November 4

Meteorological history
- Formed: October 30, 1935
- Extratropical: November 8, 1935
- Dissipated: November 8, 1935

Category 2 hurricane
- 1-minute sustained (SSHWS/NWS)
- Highest winds: 105 mph (165 km/h)
- Highest gusts: 130 mph (210 km/h) (highest directly measured)
- Lowest pressure: 964 mbar (hPa); 28.47 inHg

Overall effects
- Fatalities: 21 (+2 indirect)
- Damage: >$5.5 million (1935 USD)
- Areas affected: North Carolina; British Bahamas; Florida; eastern Gulf of Mexico
- IBTrACS
- Part of the 1935 Atlantic hurricane season

The 1935 Yankee hurricane (Note: So called after its anomalous origin and trajectory. Named colloquially before World War II, older Atlantic tropical storms were identified by their traits, such as Catholic feast days on which they occurred.) was the most significant tropical cyclone to strike metropolitan Miami in nine years. It was one of three November Atlantic hurricanes to make landfall in Florida. It was the second hurricane to hit the state in 1935, after a devastating September storm. One of a few strong hurricanes to cross Florida from the northeast, it was the seventh tropical cyclone and fifth hurricane of the annual season. It developed east of Bermuda on October 30, in an area not usually known for hurricane formation. A few days later it strengthened into a hurricane. It initially threatened the Carolinas, but then turned southwest and south, confounding forecasters. It attained its peak intensity of 105 miles per hour (165 kilometres per hour) on November 3. A small storm, it then hit the northern Bahamas, causing 14 fatalities and moderate damage—mostly to shipping—in the island chain.

On November 4, it veered westward and weakened somewhat, striking the contiguous United States just north of Miami Beach, Florida, with winds of 100 mph (155 km/h). In Florida the storm killed nine people and injured more than 150 others. It inflicted the heaviest damage to the Miami area since a 1926 hurricane. Wind gusts of up to 130 mph (210 km/h) battered a 30-mile-wide (48-kilometre) coastal area in southeastern Florida, razing hundreds of flimsy homes and unroofing well-constructed buildings. Copious rainfall combined with the winds and storm surge damaged waterfront sites, vessels, and crops. Due to its unseasonal and unusual route toward Florida, the storm was nicknamed the Yankee hurricane. After landfall, the storm weakened further, emerged into the eastern Gulf of Mexico, and executed a slow clockwise loop. Losing tropical characteristics, it dissipated just west of peninsular Florida on November 8.

== Meteorological history ==
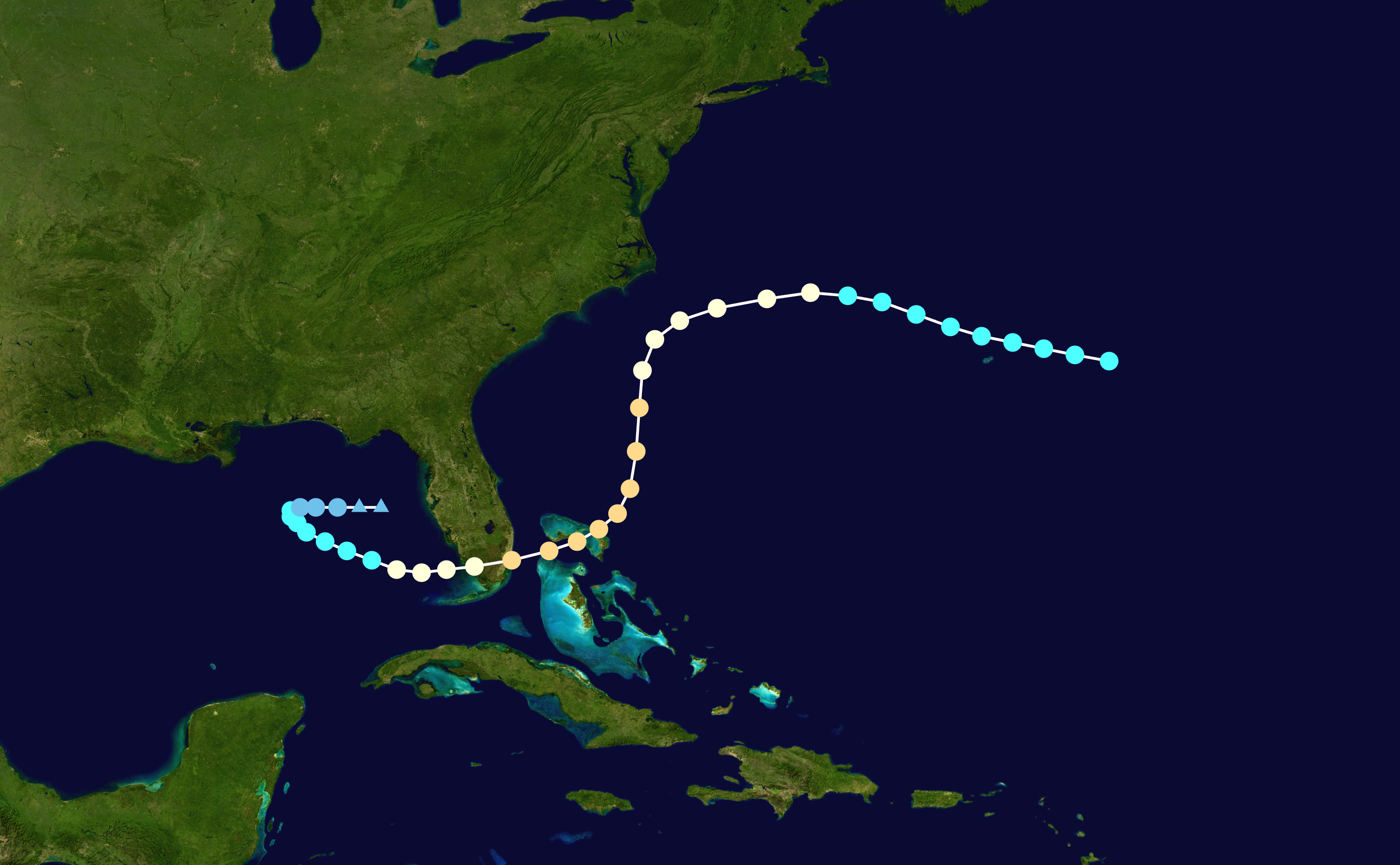
Map plotting the storm's track and intensity, according to the Saffir–Simpson scale Map key Saffir–Simpson scale Tropical depression (≤38 mph, ≤62 km/h) Tropical storm (39–73 mph, 63–118 km/h) Category 1 (74–95 mph, 119–153 km/h) Category 2 (96–110 mph, 154–177 km/h) Category 3 (111–129 mph, 178–208 km/h) Category 4 (130–156 mph, 209–251 km/h) Category 5 (≥157 mph, ≥252 km/h) Unknown Storm type Tropical cyclone Subtropical cyclone Extratropical cyclone, remnant low, tropical disturbance, or monsoon depression

On October 25, a low-pressure area formed along a weather front about 330 miles (530 kilometres) east of Bermuda. The disturbance meandered over warm ocean waters, wedged between a trough to its east and a ridge to its north. Modulated by the Icelandic Low, the ridge–trough interplay drew a polar air mass southward over the warm water, generating easterly trade winds and rising atmospheric instability. The unstable atmosphere, dominated by clashing winds, produced convection, allowing a well-defined circulation to emerge on October 29, followed by a concentrated wind field a day later. At 06:00 UTC on October 30, (Note: Dates are based on UTC unless stated otherwise.) the seventh tropical storm of the season first appeared in the hurricane databases (HURDAT) about 230 mi (370 km) east of Bermuda. (Note: Well to the north of the main genesis area for Atlantic storms at such a late date. At the time, no hurricane had been shown to have developed in the area.) It displayed uniform air temperatures like a normal tropical storm; however, its oblong circulation and uneven precipitation pattern more closely resembled a subtropical cyclone. (Note: Storms in the pre-satellite era are classified as tropical cyclones, due to a lack of in-situ data.) Based on ship observations, it headed just north of due west and intensified for a few days. On November 1, it strengthened into a minimal hurricane, (Note: Equal to Category 1 on the Saffir–Simpson scale) becoming the fifth storm of the season to do so. Reports from weather stations in its path showed a smaller-than-usual storm, marked by a compact radius of hurricane-force winds.

Late on November 1 a high-pressure area over the eastern United States deflected the storm from the Outer Banks, causing it to swerve southwestward with time. Its "hairpin"-shaped trajectory (Note: As denoted by meteorologist Ivan Ray Tannehill, among others) mirrored another storm a few weeks prior, baffling contemporary forecasters, who expected it to curve northward like a typical cyclone. The storm intensified further on November 2, as shown by barometer readings down to 28.94 inches of mercury (980 millibars) aboard a few ships in the eye of the storm, implying sustained winds of 85 mph (137 km/h) based on pressure–wind relationships. During the day, the storm bent south toward the northern Bahamas, while continuing to intensify. On November 3, the ship Queen of Bermuda entered the calm center for an hour and recorded 28.46 inHg (964 mb), the lowest pressure in the storm, which suggested a peak intensity of 105 mph (165 km/h). (Note: Equal to Category 2 on the Saffir–Simpson scale) Overnight, the storm slowed and curled southwest, striking the Abaco Islands and East Grand Bahama with the same winds. On November 4, it curved west-southwest and accelerated toward Florida, defying initial forecasts (Note: Predicting a continued southward trek toward the central Bahamas, including New Providence)—a shift meteorologists found inexplicable, owing to weak atmospheric currents.

At 18:00 UTC, it struck between present-day Bal Harbour and Sunny Isles in Dade County, Florida. Crossing the coastline and the Miami city limits, its 15-mile-wide (24 km) eye was heralded by an hour-long lull. A minimum pressure of 28.73 inHg (973 mb) in the local Weather Bureau office correlated with winds of 100 mph (155 km/h)—low-end Category 2 status—as deduced by the Atlantic hurricane reanalysis project. (Note: Given a smaller-than-average eye size, offset by factors favoring a lower intensity estimate, such as eye elongation, weaker wind reports, and increasing pressures.) Heading swiftly inland, the hurricane transited the Everglades with winds of 75–80 mph (120–130 km/h) and reached the Gulf of Mexico a short distance north of Cape Sable early on November 5. Once over water, it failed to restrengthen and degenerated into a tropical storm within 18 hours, likely due to an influx of dry, stable air from the west. A day later, ships in the gulf clocked peak winds of 52 mph (84 km/h) and pressures no lower than 1,008 mb (29.8 inHg). Within a few days, the storm arced west-northwestward and then eastward, shedding gale-force winds. It became extratropical at 12:00 UTC on November 8, and six hours later ended about 95 mi (155 km) west of the entrance to Tampa Bay.

== Preparations ==
On October 31, the United States Weather Bureau advised interests between Boston, Massachusetts, and Cape Hatteras, North Carolina, to prepare for brisk winds or gales. A day later, it issued storm warnings from the Delaware Breakwater to Boston. Mariners hastened offshore, including at Newport News, Virginia. On November 2 the Weather Bureau suspended warnings north of the Virginia Capes, instead expanding them to near New Bern, North Carolina, while noting "dangerous conditions" at sea. The agency extended its warnings later on that day to Charleston, South Carolina, and cautioned interests farther south. At first it anticipated only above-normal tides in Florida and projected a path offshore. On the following day, nonetheless, the Weather Bureau relayed information about the storm to marine and other concerns in or near Florida.

As the storm closed in on land, Bahamian officials notified islanders, including 1,500 sponge fishermen, by air, wireless, and courier networks. People in the capital Nassau barricaded their homes and all shops. On November 4, prompted by changes in the storm path, the Weather Bureau posted hurricane warnings from Stuart, Florida, to Miami, along with storm warnings up to Titusville. It predicted landfall between Miami and West Palm Beach. Hurricane warnings eventually reached Naples on the state's west coast, as well as storm warnings at Fort Myers. Later advisories included Tarpon Springs in the warned area. Areas from Key West to St. Augustine closely monitored the storm. Due to its unpredictability, the Weather Bureau was unable to warn of the storm at an early stage. Its abrupt approach took Miami citizens by surprise, many of whom only boarded up their properties during the storm.

In the United States a brand-new regional hurricane warning service issued alerts via news media and telecommunications. (Note: In 1935, the United States Hurricane Warning Service, first instituted in 1898, was reorganized, with new local offices and a 24-hour warning service being established.) South Floridians secured watercraft, shuttered windows, and closed schools. Locals besieged newspapers with storm-related questions. Seaside residents evacuated. Everglades dwellers sought safer ground, while the South Florida Red Cross Safety Committee ordered a special train on standby to transport evacuees. To avoid a repeat of the September hurricane, which claimed hundreds of lives, the Public Works Administration conveyed its workers from the Florida Keys to Homestead and Miami. In the upper Keys officials relocated more than 200 laborers by truck from the Snake Creek area to the mainland. Furthermore, the Weather Bureau released small craft advisories to caution marine interests.

Thousands of storm refugees jammed hotel lobbies in Miami. Tenders kept drawbridges open to let boaters flee, limiting vehicle access to downtown Miami. The United States Coast Guard dispatched amphibious aircraft to apprise fishermen in the Keys and along the west coast of the peninsula. Shipping was instructed to avoid hazardous waters. Beachfront communities, such as Palm Beach, erected sandbags to forestall erosion, while rerouting vehicles from vulnerable roads and bridges. Pan Am flights to and from affected areas were briefly discontinued. Due to the storm, the China Clipper—just returned from a round trip—diverted to Kingston, Jamaica. In Havana, Cuba, the P&O steamship Florida was held at port for a day.

As soon as the storm entered the Gulf of Mexico, the Weather Bureau believed it would turn landward and reenter the state north of Tampa. Accordingly, it issued storm warnings from Carrabelle to Cedar Key, while advising mariners to monitor the weather. A few days later, due to a west shift in the projected landfall toward Pensacola, the warned area was enlarged to include the entire Florida panhandle and points westward along the United States Gulf Coast as far as the Mississippi River Delta. Residents in western Florida secured fishing boats and waterside belongings. Road engineers fortified a new bridge over Apalachicola Bay days before its planned opening.

== Impact ==
Though small, the storm spread its effects from North Carolina to the Bahamas, South Florida, and the eastern Gulf of Mexico. It killed 23 people: 14 in the Bahamas and nine in Florida. In its path the storm injured about 150 people. Warnings and building codes limited the overall impact of the storm in Florida, as did its tight wind field. Monetary losses from the storm in the Bahamas were unknown. Property damage reached $5.5 million in Florida. Crop losses statewide were uncertain but significant.

=== Carolinas to the Bahamas ===
The storm sideswiped North Carolina, producing high surf and gales on the Outer Banks. Winds at Hatteras peaked at 40 mph (64 km/h). Due to high tides, Albemarle Sound and the ocean overspread nearby barrier islands. Facing poor weather, a pair of United States Navy seaplanes en route from Fernandina, Florida, made forced landings at Beaufort Inlet. In the Bahamas, the storm produced a brief period of hurricane-force winds, one to three hours in duration. The lowest barometer read 29.00 inHg (982 mb) in Hope Town on Elbow Cay, though the fiercest winds likely missed the area. The storm killed 14 people in the Bahamas, 11 of whom drowned off Great Abaco Island. Among the dead was Abaco commissioner John Eldridge Russell, who, while aiding victims of a previous storm, was pushed overboard by a boom. Damage in the Bahamas was locally severe, notably to the sponge fleet on Great Abaco. Five vessels there were torn apart and three others were severely damaged. Other damage on the island was described as modest. Clipping Grand Bahama, the storm blew at 60 mph (97 km/h) there, but damage, if any, was unknown.

=== Florida ===
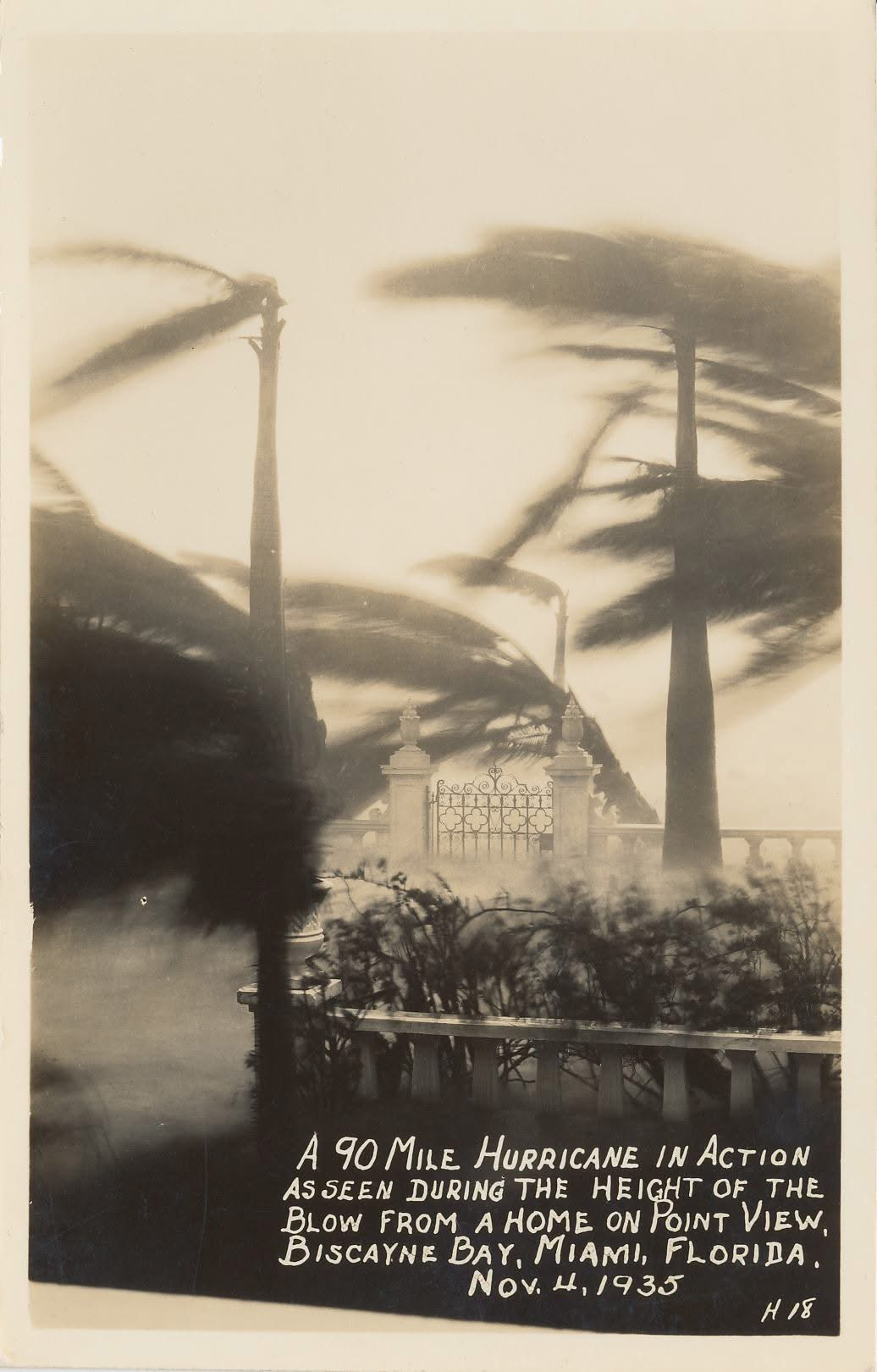
Strong winds lash palms in Miami along Biscayne Bay

A rare event, the storm was the first of three November hurricanes in Florida, behind 1985's Kate and 2022's Nicole. Of these, it was the only one to hit Greater Miami from the northeast. Alongside 1965's Betsy, it was also the first of two severe hurricanes to hit Florida from that direction. It derived its name from its origin and track, which reminded people of northern visitors. The storm was also the second of two hurricanes to hit Florida in 1935.

The cyclone brought strong winds, prolific rain, and storm surge to South Florida, though its worst effects were localized. The highest winds struck Miami, where an anemometer measured a peak gust of 130 mph (210 km/h). (Note: Estimated gusts reached 120–130 mph (190–210 km/h) at Dania, which, along with Hollywood and Fort Lauderdale, was among the worst-hit areas. Wind estimates at the latter two sites were placed at 85–90 mph (137–145 km/h). By contrast, the highest sustained wind speed recorded in South Florida reached 75 mph (121 km/h), also in Miami.) The strongest winds followed the eye passage, extending 30 mi (48 km) from the center. Limited in scope and longevity, hurricane velocities were confined between Fort Lauderdale and the southern edge of Miami. Tropical-storm-force winds occurred from West Palm Beach southward. Storm tides along the Florida coast rose 2 feet (0.61 metres) higher than usual as the storm neared, with fluctuations of 5 to 6 ft (1.5 to 1.8 m) in secluded water bodies such as inlets and bays. Driven by onshore winds, storm surge peaked at 8 ft (2.4 m) in Fort Lauderdale, with a maximum tide of 8.8 ft (2.7 m) near Port Everglades. The storm dropped locally heavy rainfall (Note: Said to be torrential in spots) over Dade and Monroe counties, peaking at 11.80 inches (300 millimetres) on Long Key. Atypically for a tropical cyclone, the storm exhibited a lopsided rain shield, with the heaviest downpours falling southeast of the track.

Nine deaths resulted from the storm in Florida, (Note: Up to 15 fatalities were rumored, including three unnamed men in the Miami area. At Dania a bridgetender believed to have drowned in a boat while fording a canal was later found alive. Additionally, 13 people—reported missing—were believed to be incommunicado.) seven directly: three from drowning, three from flying debris, and one from a collapsed home. Two deaths were from cardiac arrest due to storm stressors. A girl in Miami was fatally crushed beneath her home. Two people in Hialeah were killed by flying debris. A man in Miami suffered a deadly heart attack while installing shutters. Another man died of fright in Miami Beach. Two boaters drowned when their craft sank in Biscayne Bay. A man died aboard the tanker Hahira due to airborne debris off Fowey Rocks, near Cape Florida. An unknown seaman was found dead on Fort Lauderdale beach, possibly due to shipwreck. Off Southwest Florida the storm paralyzed the tugboat Lapwing, one of whose crew died after being rescued. Officials could not discern a cause of death. 159 Floridians were treated for injuries, (Note: Some reports listed 137, with estimates from Dade County nearing 200.) mostly slight. Most of these occurred on the peninsula below Fort Lauderdale. In all, the storm touched 3,000 families between Tavernier and Fort Lauderdale. Property losses amounted to $5.5 million in the state, mainly in the Miami metropolitan area. Most of the damage was cosmetic, consisting of broken windows and shallowly-rooted trees. The majority of leveled buildings in South Florida were fragile, while sturdier ones were unroofed.

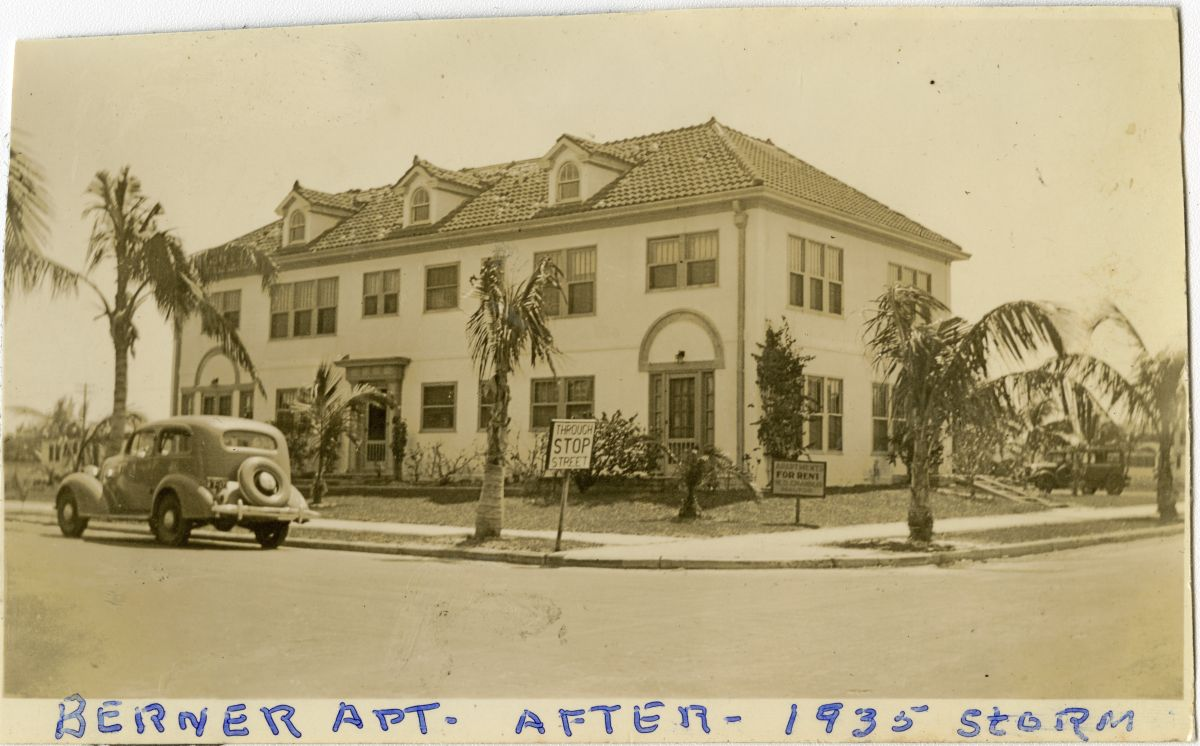
An apartment building in Hollywood after the storm

Damage was limited to the coastal Miami–Fort Lauderdale area, a function of the storm's smallness. The bulk of the damage occurred south of Deerfield. (Note: Starting near Fort Lauderdale) Hardest hit were Dania, Hollywood, and nearby parts of southern Broward County. (Note: U.S. Representative J. Mark Wilcox toured Dania, saying it received worse damage than any other point in South Florida.) Damage in Dania and Hollywood matched the 1926 storm. (Note: Some reports considered losses in both towns and neighboring Fort Lauderdale to be greater than in 1926.) Many buildings in both cities lost their walls or roofs, including 50 homes, a bank, a casino, apartments, and hotels. At Dania (Note: Almost entirely damaged, exceeding half of the buildings) the storm razed frame homes, a cannery, and a few garages. Many well-built buildings were severely damaged, including the mayor's home, a school, a parsonage, and a pharmacy. In Hollywood the storm smashed 74 homes and badly damaged 20 others. The storm also wrecked a boardwalk. The fringe of damaging winds impacted Fort Lauderdale, tearing at roofs, frail buildings, windows, and automobiles. The storm leveled six homes, a fruit mart, and a concession stand, along with six buildings at a Coast Guard base. Wind damage in Broward County topped $1 million, including to crops. Countywide, 40 or more homes were irreparably damaged and 350 required fixes. All county schools were damaged to some degree, with the Dania facility incurring the worst loss, mostly due to water seepage. Another school was destroyed at Oakland Park.

Damage scenes from the Miami area

In Miami and its environs, property losses totaled about $1 million, making the storm the most eventful since 1926. More than 50 injuries occurred in the Hialeah area, on the northwestern outskirts of the city, where most people lived and the heaviest wind damage centered. The winds razed dozens of stucco and frame dwellings, pinning down residents beneath walls and roofs. Over 230 homes were demolished, including Hialeah's African-American residential area. The storm also leveled a church, grocery, barber shop, and city garage. Winds also damaged the Hialeah Park Race Track. In Miami gusty winds shattered several hundred windows, especially storefront plate glass, and tossed building debris, causing injuries. The winds unroofed large buildings, such as a Florida East Coast Railway (FEC) station and a hardware shop. Building interiors were drenched with rainwater due to roof or window damage, including the Morning Herald and Daily News offices. Debris cluttered Flagler Street in downtown Miami. In Miami the yacht basin accounted for most of the $100,000 in losses to public property. Half the roof of an airport building on the Venetian Islands was torn off. In Miami Springs the storm damaged a water treatment plant and destroyed a 1.5-mile (2.4 km) row of power lines to which it was joined. At Ojus a railroad station was uplifted. In the Miami neighborhood of Coconut Grove, winds flattened outbuildings.

Beyond the Miami–Fort Lauderdale area, damage severity lessened. In nearby Coral Gables, the hurricane destroyed several buildings, while also damaging signs, power lines, and trees. In Homestead, many homes lost their roofs. Minor damage occurred farther south, including in the Florida Keys, and along the southwestern mainland up to Everglades City. Strong winds knocked down trees and a Seminole camp along the Tamiami Trail in Collier County. In Palm Beach County wind damage was restricted to roofs, vegetation, lampposts, wires, and lightweight structures, mostly in the southern part of the county. Outside Dade County, the storm wrecked about 100 homes and severely damaged a similar amount. Roughly 400 homes required minimal repairs. Over 1,000 families reported damage. Three men were rescued on Soldier Key after staying overnight there due to their boat capsizing. Stormy conditions on the Lake Worth Lagoon caused a ferryboat to break free from its berth. A pair of steel barges were unmoored outside Jupiter, spurring the Coast Guard to send five vessels in a precautionary search-and-rescue operation. Rough seas occurred as far north as the First Coast, leaving behind or unearthing objects such as beach wrack and late-18th-century Spanish silver coins.

Higher-than-normal tides and rainfall caused widespread flooding, damaging waterfront structures. Along the coast, the tides isolated beaches and adjacent roads. Surf caused erosion from Palm Beach southward, gouging out roadways such as Highway A1A. Raging seas crumpled oceanside cabanas. High tides flooded neigborhoods, covering lawns and roads with sand. Local watercourses spilled over their rims from rainwater runoff and tides. In Fort Lauderdale the tides beached a flotel across New River Sound and damaged watercraft along the river. Water depths reached 2 ft (0.61 m) downtown, flooding several blocks. Tides on Biscayne Bay crested at 6 ft (1.8 m), damaging marinas and docks. Due to the tides, small watercraft sustained losses of $120,000 in Greater Miami. Scores of vessels grounded off Miami Beach and in Biscayne Bay, including two Bull Line freighters and a pair of yachts that sustained severe damage after they drifted onto the County Causeway. Water overtopped the causeway, the main avenue linking the beach and the mainland, halting traffic. Dozens of cars on the causeway were blown into Biscayne Bay, while others were stranded there and on the nearby 79th Street causeway, causing motorists to be rescued. Due to 10 ft (3.0 m) of washouts, police blocked access to the causeway. Seawater depths of 4 ft (1.2 m) covered portions of Miami Beach, and water levels rose 4 to 5 ft (1.2 to 1.5 m) above ground along the Miami waterside. Freshwater flooding marooned cars on the Tamiami Trail, compelling drivers to abandon their vehicles. Most of the damage to buildings on Miami Beach was from rainwater seepage.

All communities have, by force of circumstances, reverted to the kerosene lamp stage and in many instances to candles for illumination of homes.

— Miami Herald

The storm disabled telegraph and telephone lines, crippling communication with Miami. It shut down electric utilities across the storm-hit region. Loss of communication stymied efforts to locate the eye of the storm or warn people, as the storm disrupted transmitters and downed hurricane signals. Fallen power lines and poles lay strewn across roads in Greater Miami, including Federal Highway, the main artery linking the towns. Law enforcement urged people to avoid streets due to live wires. In Broward and Dade counties, winds felled 1,000 telephone poles. Florida Power & Light (FPL) officials likened damage in the worst-hit swath to the 1926 storm. Damage to FPL infrastructure between Pompano and South Miami totaled $500,000. The storm split or toppled several antenna towers, some designed for 100-mile-per-hour (160 km/h) winds. WIOD, WQAM, and Tropical Radio stations relied, if possible, on backup communications or reduced power generation. Losses to public utilities in Greater Miami reached $750,000. Roads between cities were choked by storm debris, including pieces of hovels, blocking traffic. A packing house was blown onto the FEC Railway at Hallandale, delaying a train. In the path of strongest winds, the storm flipped vehicles. Others were crushed by fallen trees.

Crops regionwide suffered greatly from high winds and flash floods. In Dade County agricultural losses reached $1 million, mostly to tomato growers on elevated land. The storm destroyed 14,000 avocado and citrus trees, comprising 90% of the crop. Winds uprooted three-quarters of large avocado and 80% of the citrus trees, with a $500,000 loss. Almost all grapefruit was blown off the trees as well. Fruit crops were extensively damaged at Homestead and the Redlands, with up to a quarter of the citrus lost at the latter. Citrus losses were heavy in Broward County, totaling $200,000 at Davie. Local farmers reported that their crop was unsalvageable. Crop fields were submerged in the Everglades, drowning all plantings. Potatoes suffered near-complete losses due to flooding, adding up to 25% of the total crop in South Florida. Winter truck produce was badly damaged. Snap beans were destroyed from Deerfield southward, along with peppers. Canals overflowed, flooding many farms near Pompano and Dania, including bean fields at the latter. The storm extensively damaged ornamental vegetation in South Florida, shredding gardens and parks. Australian pines, royal palms, coconut palms, tamarinds, and oaks were blown down, snapped, or shorn of their canopies. Miami Beach lost 500–1,000 tall coconut palms. Ferns and other shrubs were torn up or defoliated as well, littering public places. Local parks were mangled, including Bayfront, Greynolds, and Tropical. Total losses to horticulture reached $150,000 in southeastern Florida.

== Aftermath ==
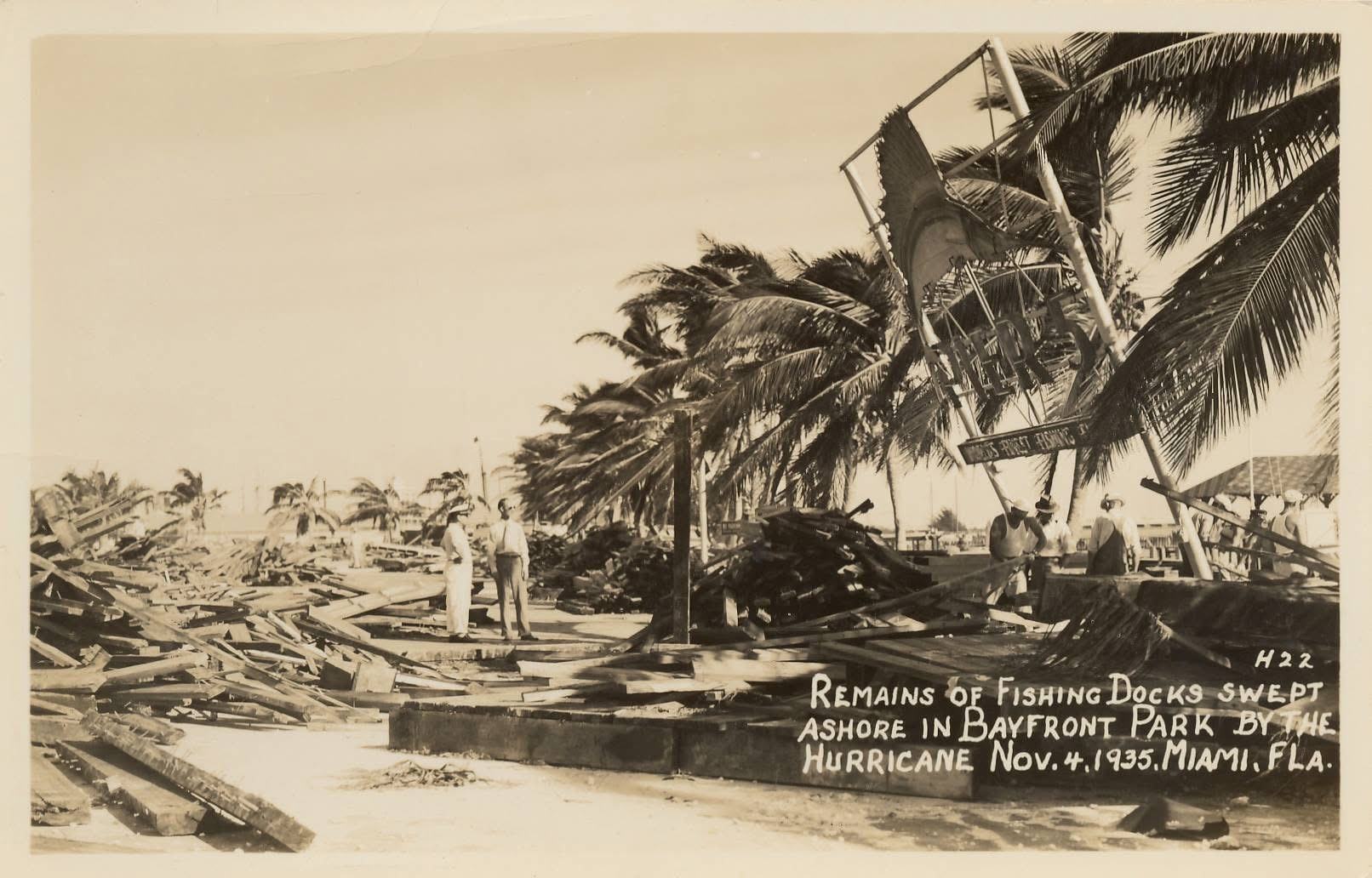
Ruins of docks in Miami after the storm

Following the storm, Miami mayor A. D. H. Fossey requested Federal Emergency Relief Administration (FERA) and Red Cross funds. Noting a citywide budget deficit, he called for $150,000 in storm financing, including from the state. On his behalf, senator Park Trammell asked for federal aid to cover $200,000 in losses to city property. Other communities desiring federal assistance included Fort Lauderdale and Hollywood, the latter of which applied for a $250,000 WPA loan. The Red Cross assessed 2,200 familes as needing aid in Dade and Broward counties. Over 500 applicants partook of free relief at five joint FERA–Red Cross staging areas in Greater Miami. A total of 3,233 FERA recipients awaiting Works Progress Administration (WPA) jobs were assigned work with the latter on post-storm cleanup. About 782 WPA laborers transferred from normal tasks to storm repair. Many homes in Broward County needed Red Cross repairs.

In the aftermath, the city of Miami issued boil-water advisories due to sewerage disruptions. Supplies of lanterns and candles ran low in some areas due to power outages, while cracks in water mains imperiled the flow of potable water by lowering pressure. One-way traffic was enacted on the County Causeway after the storm due to a dredge collision that removed 40 ft (12 m) of roadway. P&O scrapped ferry service between Port Everglades and Havana, stranding racehorses—originally slated to perform at Oriental Park Racetrack—in two railcars on a siding south of Fort Lauderdale. Red Cross Florida relief director George E. Meyer headquartered in the McAllister Hotel, where 400 relief appeals circulated. As many as 600 Miamians solicited the Red Cross for necessities, while 200 individuals volunteered aid. Hotels opened to women with infants and elderly aid recipients, while Hialeah officials ordered food for 30 families. Relief equipment arrived by truck from elsewhere in Florida, along with aid workers from Birmingham, Alabama. Two veterans' organizations, the Veterans of Foreign Wars and the American Legion, fielded volunteers to help police curb looting. A shortage of cots at the county arsenal led the local National Guard to requisition additional beds from Tampa.

== See also ==
- List of Florida hurricanes

- List of Florida hurricanes (1900–1949)
- Hurricane Gordon – Looped and struck Florida a second time as a weaker cyclone in November
