= 1935 Pacific typhoon season =

Seasonal boundaries
- First system formed: January 29, 1935
- Last system dissipated: December 24, 1935

Strongest storm
- Name: Unnamed

Seasonal statistics
- Total depressions: 24
- Total fatalities: Unknown
- Total damage: Unknown

Related articles
- 1935 Atlantic hurricane season; 1935 Pacific hurricane season; 1930s North Indian Ocean cyclone seasons

In 1935, there were 24 tropical cyclones across the western part of the Pacific Ocean.

== Systems ==
=== January–July ===
The first storm of the year formed on January 29 north of the Caroline Islands. The storm moved north over the following days, curving west. The storm later dissipated on January 31.

==== Unnamed Storm (April 2-7) ====
On April 2, a storm formed east of the Philippines. The storm drifted northwest and later curved west. The storm then made landfall over Samar, specifically over, then curved north, drifting between the island of Marinduque and Bondoc Peninsula on April 7. The storm traversed just south of Infanta, Quezon before weakening and entering the South China Sea as a tropical depression. The storm then dissipated on April 8 just east of Ilocos. When the storm made landfall over Borongan, meteorologists recorded deep convection and well development over the area. Because of the storm, four people were dead and hundreds were left homeless. Another count showed that 37 people died in Samar Island, 22 died in Tayabas, and one person died in Sorsogon. A newspaper reported that when the storm hit the Philippines, 100 fishermen departed, with only 17 of the bodies being found. Another newspaper reported that 78 other fishermen departed, with 58 of the bodies being found, while the other 20 were lost.

On July 2, a storm formed east of the Northern Mariana Islands. The storm curved north and dissipated shortly after on July 4. On July 12, a depression formed between Yap and Palau. The storm then went northwest, curving to a northern curve. On July 13, a storm formed east of the Philippines. The storm moved east and made landfall over the Philippines on July 17. The storm then made landfall over Hainan the following day and shortly after dissipated. On July 14, a storm formed east of the Philippines, the storm drifted east and then curved north. The storm then curved east again and made landfall over China on July 23, dissipating the same day.

==== Unnamed Storm (July 28–August 12) ====
On July 28, a storm spawned east of Taiwan. The storm moved west over the following days, making landfall in Taiwan, then moved north. making landfall in China for three days. The storm then curved east and made landfall over Jeju Island. The storm later made landfall over Japan and dissipated on August 12. The storm caused flooding in the Yalu River, engulfing 15,000 houses, with reported floods as high as 24 feet. 110,000 people in the Japanese city of Antung were deemed homeless. Nakaeno-Island was also deemed completely submerged. in Asahi, Chiba, 50 people were believed to be dead after a building they were housed in collapsed. Hours were spent trying to find people and rescue residents. All-in-all, the storm cost 10 million yen.

=== August ===
On August 1, a storm formed east of Taiwan. The storm then drifted northwest, where it made landfall over Taiwan. After the storm crossed Formosa, the winds decreased, with the temperature unfazed. Even though the storm was 400 miles (640 kilometres) away from Aparri, the storm still caused heavy rains across Manila and Baguio. Later, the storm curved north, where it made landfall over mainland China. The storm caused damage over China, marooning 200 foreigners in China. The storm also flooded the Min River, Fujian. Fujian was decided as the worst-hit province in China. The storm also caused heavy rain over the northern part of the archipelago. On August 16, a storm spawned just east of Mindanao because of an extensive high-pressure area weakening, converting into a low-pressure area just near Guam. The storm drifted northwest before traversing around in a circle-like shape and making landfall in Taiwan on August 23. The storm then went northeast, with a ripple-like drift in between, The storm then made landfall in Japan on September 1 and dissipated the next day. On August 19, a storm spawned in the Pacific Ocean. The storm then went northwest and later curved northeast, making landfall in Japan on August 28. The storm then continued, and then made landfall in the tip of Russia on September 1, shortly dissipating. After the storm, newspapers from Manila uncovered a death toll of 42 in Japan. On August 31, a storm formed east of the Philippines. The storm went northwest, then curved northeast, making landfall in South Korea on September 8. A few days later, the storm again made landfall over Japan on September 10. The storm then continued and dissipated the next day.

=== September ===
On September 1, a storm formed northeast of Guam. It moved north-northwest before approaching the Ryukyu Islands. The typhoon then changed its direction to northeast, before dissipating on September 12. On September 12, a storm formed east of Samar. The storm drifted northwest, directly impacting the Philippines. The storm then dissipated on September 21. As a result of the storm, three people died, with 100 families in Baler. Tayabas deemed homeless. An air survey was done by the International Red Cross and Red Crescent Movement to help relief efforts. When the storm hit Manila, power lines were deemed unusable, preventing accurate death-toll information. On September 15, a storm formed in the Pacific Ocean. The storm curved west, then drifted north and made landfall on Japan. The storm later curved northeast, dissipating on September 25. As a result, 48 people were pronounced dead and 100 people were declared missing in multiple provinces in Japan. A steamer was declared missing, too, with 13 crew members and 19 passengers aboard the steamer. Just a day later, the death toll was counted as 80, with 32 deaths in Niigata Prefecture, Yamanashi Prefecture, and Gunma Prefecture. On September 19, a storm formed east of the Northern Mariana Islands. The storm moved north, making landfall over the northern portion of Japan on September 26 and dissipating on the same day. On September 27, a storm formed south of Japan. The storm drifted north then curved northwest, before dissipating on October 1.

=== October ===
On October 1, a storm formed east of Samar. The storm moved northwest before making landfall over the northern part of Luzon on October 5. The storm then continued and made landfall over Hainan and Vietnam on October 9 before dissipating the same day. On October 2, a storm formed south of Sapporo, the storm traversed north before curving northeast, directly missing Sapporo. The storm dissipated on October 7. Between Samar Island and Leyte, a storm formed on October 10. The storm traversed northwest, directly impacting Leyte and Iloilo. The storm then continued northwest, making landfall in Vietnam on October 13 and dissipating the same day. On October 31, a storm formed in the middle of the ocean. The storm curved northeast in a "squiggly shape". The storm then dissipated on November 3.

=== November–December ===
On November 9, a storm formed east of Mindanao. The storm ventured northwest, directly making landfall over the Philippines before curving east and making a loop-de-loop. The storm then curved north and curved northeast. The storm dissipated on November 27.

On December 2, a storm formed south of the Northern Mariana Islands. The storm ventured north before curving northwest. The storm then dissipated on December 6. On December 8, a storm appeared east of Ilocos. The storm ventured west before curving southwest, making landfall on December 9. The storm then curved back west and made landfall on Vietnam on December 12, dissipating the same day. On December 16, the last storm of the season formed east of Mindanao. The storm drifted north and then curved west. The storm then made landfall on the Philippines on December 23, dissipating the next day.

== See also ==
- 1935 Pacific hurricane season
- 1935 Atlantic hurricane season
- 1930s North Indian Ocean cyclone seasons
- 1900–1950 South-West Indian Ocean cyclone seasons
- 1900–1940 South Pacific cyclone seasons
- 1930s Australian region cyclone seasons
