= 1935 Pacific hurricane season =

Seasonal boundaries
- First system formed: July 1, 1935
- Last system dissipated: August 26, 1935

Strongest storm
- Name: Two
  - Lowest pressure: 1002 mbar (hPa; 29.59 inHg)

Seasonal statistics
- Total storms: 5
- Hurricanes: 1
- Total fatalities: Unknown
- Total damage: Unknown

Related articles
- 1935 Atlantic hurricane season; 1935 Pacific typhoon season; 1930s North Indian Ocean cyclone seasons

The 1935 Pacific hurricane season ran through the summer and fall of 1935. Before the satellite age started in the 1960s, data on east Pacific hurricanes was extremely unreliable. Most east Pacific storms were of no threat to land. This season saw three tropical cyclones and ended early in August.

== Systems ==
=== Tropical Storm One ===
A tropical storm caused gales in Manzanillo on July 1.

=== Tropical Cyclone Two ===
On August 5, a tropical cyclone formed just off the coast of Mexico. It generally moved west-northwest, and was last seen August 9. The storm caused gales, and a ship reported a pressure reading of 29.61 inHg (100.3 kPa).

=== Tropical Cyclone Three ===
South of the Gulf of Tehuantepec, a tropical cyclone formed on August 17. It remained poorly organized and moved slowly, making landfall on August 20. It had moved back off shore by August 21. It headed northwest, passing west of Cabo San Lucas, and hugged the Pacific coast of the Baja California Peninsula. It rapidly weakened as it headed north, and its remnants made landfall near Point Conception, California, on August 26 and dissipated after that.

The tropical cyclone destroyed many buildings in Salina Cruz on August 20. It also blew down trees and downed power lines. No casualties were reported. The tropical cyclone remnants also caused rainfall of up to 2 inches (51 mm) in parts of California and Arizona.

== See also ==
- 1935 Atlantic hurricane season
- 1935 Pacific typhoon season
- 1930s North Indian Ocean cyclone seasons
- 1900–1940 South Pacific cyclone seasons
- 1900–1950 South-West Indian Ocean cyclone seasons
- 1930s Australian region cyclone seasons
