= Radius of outermost closed isobar =

Measurement of tropical cyclone size

Size descriptions of tropical cyclones
ROCI	Type
Less than 2 degrees latitude	Very small/midget
2 to 3 degrees of latitude	Small
3 to 6 degrees of latitude	Medium/Average
6 to 8 degrees of latitude	Large
Over 8 degrees of latitude	Very large

The radius of outermost closed isobar (ROCI) is one of the quantities used to determine the size of a tropical cyclone. It is determined by measuring the radii from the center of the storm to its outermost closed isobar in four quadrants, which is then averaged to come up with a scalar value. It generally delimits the outermost extent of a tropical cyclone's wind circulation.

Use of this measure has objectively determined that tropical cyclones in the northwest Pacific Ocean are the largest on Earth on average, with North Atlantic tropical cyclones roughly half their size. Active databases of ROCI are maintained by the National Hurricane Center for systems tracked in the eastern north Pacific and north Atlantic basins.

== Database ==
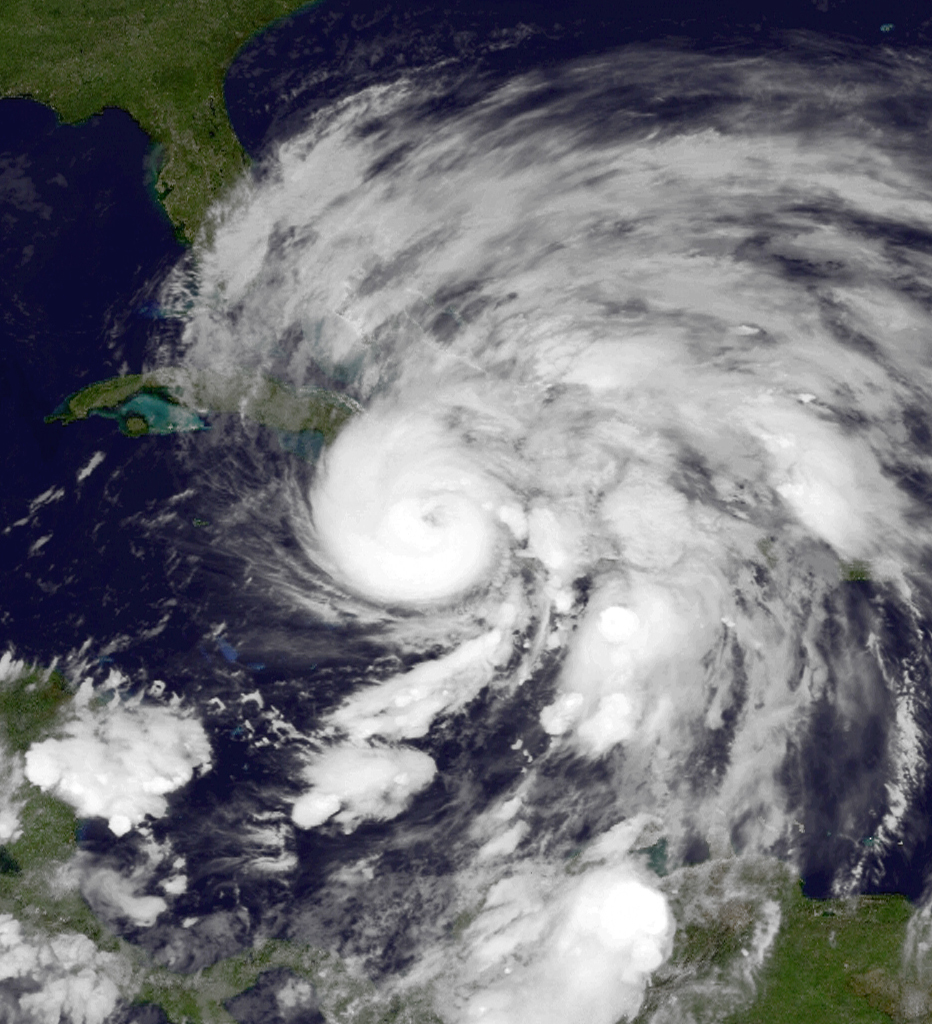
Hurricane Sandy at peak intensity.

A global once-daily dataset was compiled for a 1984 research paper, which covered global tropical cyclones between 1957 and 1977. Previously, a database was created to determine ROCI values for the western north Pacific Ocean in 1972, using data from 1945 to 1968. Another database with additional ROCI information is currently being modified at the Hydrometeorological Prediction Center for use in matching ongoing tropical cyclones to past systems for the purposes of finding rainfall analogs to an ongoing event, which has fairly continuous data running back to 1959 for the north Atlantic Ocean.

== Variation ==
Tropical cyclones tend to be smaller during the mid-summer, and largest in October in the Northern Hemisphere. As tropical cyclones initially develop, the size of their ROCI initially contracts. Once tropical cyclones reach maturity, their isobaric patterns increase in size. During the mature stage, the broadening pressure pattern leads to some reduction in their maximum sustained wind, but the extent of their tropical storm and hurricane-force winds is the most extensive within the storm's life cycle. An increase in size is also noted as a tropical cyclone gains latitude. As tropical cyclones weaken, their ROCI values diminish. In general, the size of a tropical cyclone shows little relation to its intensity. Use of this measure has objectively determined that tropical cyclones in the northwest Pacific Ocean are the largest on earth on average, with North Atlantic tropical cyclones roughly half their size.

== See also ==
- Radius of maximum wind
