= List of Cayman Islands hurricanes =

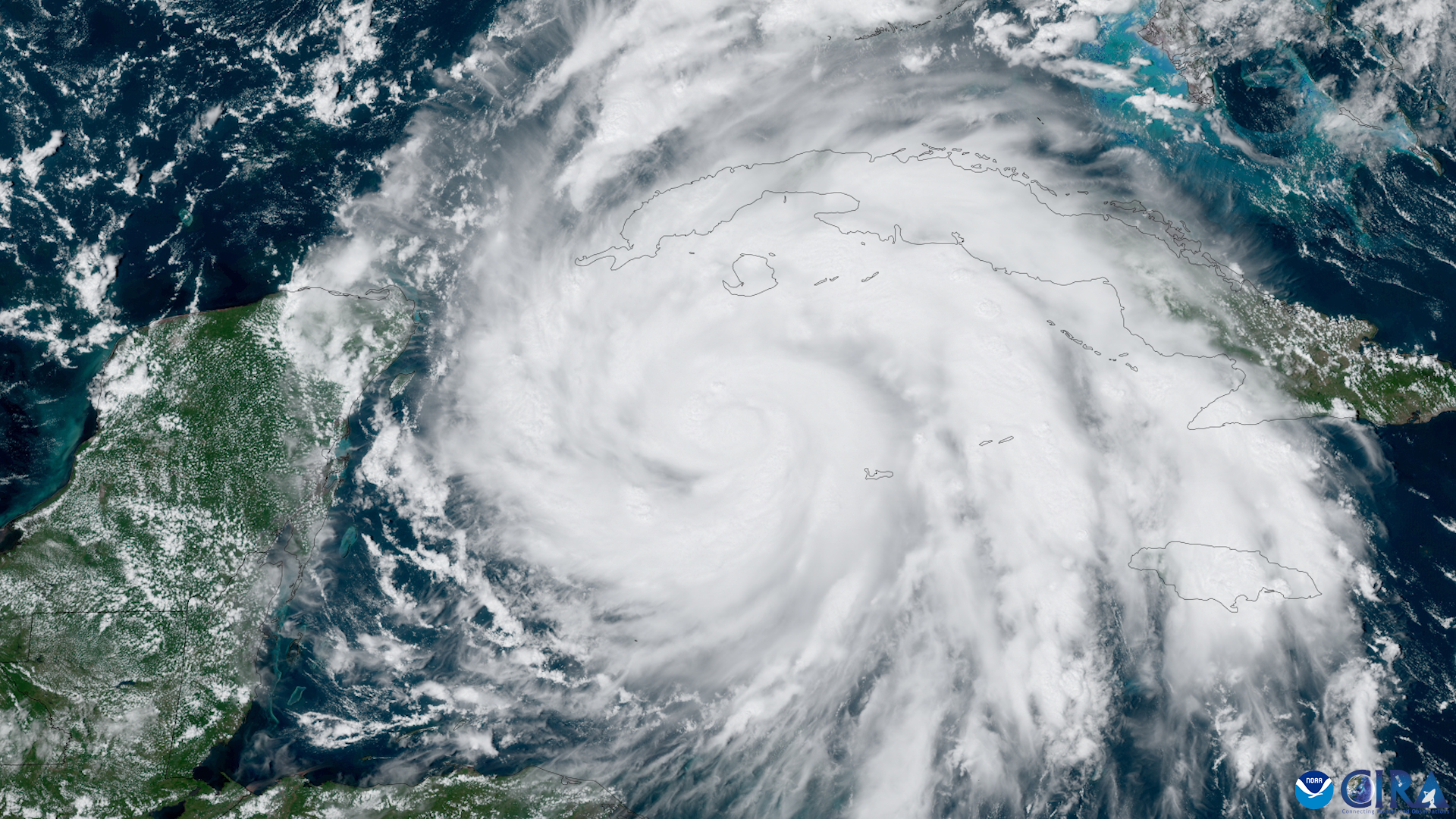
Hurricane Ian passing to the west of the Cayman Islands on 26 September 2022

The Cayman Islands is a self-governing British Overseas Territory, comprising three islands, Grand Cayman which is the largest, Cayman Brac, and Little Cayman which is the smallest. The Cayman Islands are located in the Northwestern Caribbean, South of Cuba, West of Haiti and Northeast of Honduras. The islands are located within the Hurricane Belt and frequently impacted by Tropical Storms and Hurricanes. Cayman's History of Hurricanes can be traced back from the 1700s right through to current day.

The List of Cayman Island hurricanes covers all hurricanes and tropical storms affecting the Cayman Islands from 1700 to 2021.

== 1700s ==
- September 1731 - First known recorded tropical cyclone to affect the Cayman Islands.
- September 1735 - A storm strikes the Cayman Islands, but no details are available.
- August 1751 - A storm causes high waves in Pedro St. James.
- 28 August 1785 - The first known tropical cyclone to affect Cayman Islands to be described in detail.
- October 1793 - A storm causes devastation in the Cayman Islands, with records stating that the population was still struggling to recover in February 1794.

== 1800s ==
=== 1810s ===
- October 1812 - A late-season hurricane strikes Grand Cayman.

=== 1830s ===
- 28 September – 27 October 1837, or 1838 - Two hurricanes affect the Cayman Islands causing significant damage, though the year is disputed due to conflicting reports.

=== 1840s ===
- 10 October 1846 - The Great Havana Hurricane of 1846 travels across the Cayman Islands, producing high winds.

=== 1850s ===
- 1851 – Beginning of the NHC's Hurricane Database (HURDAT).
- 7 October 1852 – Hurricane Five moved into the Cayman area as a Category 2 Hurricane and passed near Grand Cayman.
- 27–28 September 1857 – Hurricane Four moved into the Cayman area as a strong Category 1 Hurricane passing near Grand Cayman it became a Category 2 Hurricane just West of Grand Cayman.

=== 1860s ===
- 10 September 1865 - Hurricane Four moved into the Cayman area passing through the Sister Islands of Little Cayman and Cayman Brac and just North of Grand Cayman as a Strong Category 2 Hurricane.
- 22 October 1865 - Hurricane Seven passed just West of Grand Cayman as a strong Category 1 Hurricane becoming a Category 2 Hurricane just North West of Grand Cayman.
- 15–16 August 1866 - Hurricane Two passed South of Grand Cayman late 15 August through early 16 as a Category 2 Hurricane.
- 5–6 October 1868 - Hurricane Three was observed South of Grand Cayman moving North West passing South West of Grand Cayman as a strong Category 2 Hurricane

=== 1870s ===
- 6 October 1870 - Hurricane Six passed near Cayman Brac and Little Cayman as a strong tropical Storm becoming a hurricane just north of the islands.
- 30 September – 3 October 1873 - Hurricane Five moved slowly into the Cayman area late 30 September as a tropical storm passing near all three Islands then departing west of Grand Cayman early 3 October.
- 17 October 1876 - The Cuba-South Florida Hurricane of 1876 passes just east of Grand Cayman, causing significant damage.
- 13 August 1878 - Hurricane Two passed just southwest of Grand Cayman as a tropical storm.
- 19–20 October 1878 - Hurricane Eleven Gale of 1878 moved slowly northwest into the Cayman area on 19 August moving over Grand Cayman and became a hurricane late on the 19th and into early 20th.
- 9–10 August 1879 - Hurricane Three passes southwest of Grand Cayman as a Tropical Storm.
- 4–6 October 1879 - Tropical Storm Five passes near the western side of Grand Cayman.
- 12–13 October 1879 - Tropical Storm Six moves through the Cayman Islands passing between Grand Cayman and Little Cayman.

=== 1880s ===
- 7–8 August 1880 - Hurricane Two passed near Grand Cayman as a Category 2 Hurricane.
- 7–8 October 1882 - Hurricane Six slowly passed just West of Grand Cayman while rapidly intensifying from a category 1 to a category 3 Hurricane.
- 27–28 June 1886 - Hurricane Three formed South-South East of the Cayman Islands as a Tropical Storm and moved over Little Cayman becoming a Hurricane thereafter.
- 14–15 July 1886 - Hurricane Four formed as a Tropical Storm 105 miles West-South West of Grand Cayman. The storm produced heavy rains and gusty winds over Grand Cayman.
- 20–21 August 1886 - Hurricane Six passed just East of Cayman Brac as a Category 3 Major Hurricane.
- 18–19 September 1886 - Hurricane Eight passed just North of the Cayman Islands as a Tropical Storm.
- 8 October 1886 - Hurricane Ten was observed as a Tropical Storm just North West of Grand Cayman.
- 18 May 1887 - Tropical Storm Two passing just East of Cayman Brac as a Tropical storm.
- 7–8 August 1887 - Tropical Storm Five passing just North of the Cayman Islands later dissipating later on 8 August North West of Grand Cayman.
- 15 September 1887 - Hurricane Nine passed South West of Grand Cayman as a category 2.
- 13 October 1887 - Hurricane Thirteen passed near Cayman Brac and Little Cayman and just North of Grand Cayman as a Category 1 Hurricane.
- 15 June 1889 - Hurricane Two formed West-North West of Grand Cayman on 15 June.
- 16 September 1889 - Hurricane Six passed just South West of Grand Cayman as a Tropical Storm and became a Hurricane just West of Grand Cayman.
- 5 October 1889 - Tropical Storm Nine formed just North West of Grand Cayman as a Tropical Depression on 5 October.

=== 1890s ===
- 23–24 August 1890 - Tropical storm Two passed near Grand Cayman and attained peak intensity of 60 mph while 80 miles South-South West of Grand Cayman.
- 4–5 October 1891 - Tropical Storm Seven passed near Western Grand Cayman.
- 20 October 1893 - Tropical Storm Eleven formed and moved over the Cayman Islands on 20 October as a Tropical Depression.
- 7–8 June 1894 Tropical Storm One moved slowly near Cayman Brac and Little Cayman and over Grand Cayman as a Tropical Storm.
- 25 August 1895 - Hurricane Two passed near Grand Cayman as a Category 2 Hurricane.
- 19–21 October 1895 - Hurricane Five moved near Grand Cayman as a Category 2 Hurricane while moving slowly North then North East near the Island.
- 4 July 1896 - Hurricane One was first observed Just North of Grand Cayman as a Tropical Storm.
- September 1896 - Hurricane Four 1896 Cedar Keys hurricane Moved into the Cayman area on 26 September as a strengthening Category 1 Hurricane and became a Category 2 Hurricane just before moving near Grand Cayman later that day. Hurricane Four became a Category 3 Major Hurricane just West of Grand Cayman.
- 25 September 1897 - Tropical Storm Four was spotted near 100 miles West of Grand Cayman.
- 14–18 October 1897 - Hurricane Five moved slowly West-North West to North West passing to the South West of Grand Cayman as a Tropical Storm. The storm slowly recurved North East and strengthened while passing near to Grand Cayman. The storm became a Hurricane while passing between Grand Cayman and the Sister Islands.
- 8–9 October 1898 - Tropical Storm Nine moved into the Cayman area after moving past Jamaica moving over Grand Cayman very early 9 October.
- 27–28 October 1899 - Hurricane Nine moved into the Cayman area as a strengthening Tropical Storm, becoming a Hurricane after moving over Little Cayman.

== 1900s ==
- 11 Jun 1901 - Tropical Storm One formed near Grand Cayman.
- 6–7 Jul 1901 - Tropical Storm Two moved over the Cayman Islands.
- 14–15 September 1901 - Hurricane Eight moved through the Cayman Islands becoming a Hurricane as it neared Cayman Brac on 14 September and peak intensity as it moved near Grand Cayman.
- 23–25 September 1901 - Tropical Storm Ten passes just W of Grand Cayman.
- 15 October 1901 - Tropical Storm Twelve formed as a Tropical Depression just North of Cayman Brac.
- 12–13 June 1902 - Tropical Storm One formed as a Tropical Depression just West of Grand Cayman moved North-North East intensifying to Tropical Storm North of Grand Cayman.
- 11 August 1903 - The 1903 Jamaica hurricane passes through the Cayman Islands, bringing winds of 120 miles per hour and a minimum pressure of 958 mbar. Though the hurricane passed through quickly it was very destructive with the Governor later stating "Although the storm was of short duration, the results were tragic.". More than 200 houses and seven of the eight churches on Grand Cayman were destroyed or heavily damaged, while in the harbor only one of the 23 ships present survived. The worst damage happened in the northern parts of Grand Cayman. Many of the crew on board the ships in the harbor were killed but the loss of life on Grand Cayman was minimal.
- 14–15 October 1904 - Hurricane Four was first noted about 185 miles South South East of Jamaica on the 12th moving North West passing South and West of Jamaica. It then moved North as it moved into the Cayman area and strengthened. During the afternoon of the 14th it made landfall on Cayman Brac and became a hurricane before leaving the Cayman area.
- 5–7 November 1906 - Hurricane Eleven formed as a Tropical Depression on the 5th just South South West of Grand Cayman the system slowly moved North and became Tropical Storm just off Western Grand Cayman that day. The Tropical storm then slowly turned North East then East North East passing near North Western and Northern Grand Cayman intensifying while doing so during the 6th. By the 7th the storm was now a hurricane leaving the Cayman area and heading to Cuba.
- 17–18 July 1909 - The 1909 Velasco hurricane moved across the Caribbean into the Cayman area and passing just to the West side of Grand Cayman before departing the area.
- 6–7 August 1909 - Tropical Storm Five formed as Tropical Depression on the 6th just South West of Jamaica and was moving NW across the North West Caribbean passing near Western Grand Cayman and before leaving the Cayman area strengthening to Tropical Storm.
- 24 August 1909 - The 1909 Monterrey hurricane passes just north of the Cayman Islands. Recorded rainfall in George Town was 6 inches; Bodden Town was 6.25 inches; and East End was 12.32 inches. Trees were blown across the roads and roads were under three feet of water. After the storm many of the trees were hauled back into position and, which took root afresh the following year. Most of the damage from the hurricane was done to ships in dock at Grand Cayman and Cayman Brac.
- 15–16 September 1909 - The 1909 Grand Isle hurricane formed as a Tropical Depression South of Hispaniola on the 13th. The system would maintain Tropical Depression status for a couple days as it passed near the North Coast of Jamaica. Tt would then become Tropical Storm just off of North West Jamaica early on the 15th and entering the Cayman area later that day. The storm would pass just North of Grand Cayman late on the 15th going into the 16th and before leaving the Cayman area it then became a hurricane.
- 8–9 October 1909 - The 1909 Florida Keys hurricane formed in the South West Caribbean on the 6th the storm moved North West into the North West Caribbean and slowed down and turned a bit more West North West as it neared the Cayman area around the 8th. The storm then quickly intensified into a Major hurricane just passing of Grand Cayman's West side. The Major Hurricane started to move out of the Cayman area late hours of the 9th into early hours of the 10th.

=== 1910s ===
- 12 October 1910 - The 1910 Cuba hurricane brushes Grand Cayman with minimal damage.
- August or September 1914 - There were multiple reports of a tropical storm that developed in the northwest Caribbean with a minimum pressure of 1004 mbar. There are conflicting reports for an exact location and whether or not it was deemed a tropical depression or tropical storm. As such, this storm was never recorded to the HURDAT or in the HURDAT reanalysis in 2005.
- 13 August 1915 - The 1915 Galveston hurricane devastates the Cayman Islands. Three-fourths of the 270 houses on Cayman Brac were destroyed, leaving 1,800 people destitute. All homes were destroyed in Stake Bay after the storm surge penetrated 0.5 mi (0.80 km) inland; collapsing walls killed one child. Nearly all of the island's coconut trees were destroyed, while half of the coconut trees on Little Cayman were drowned. All buildings in Little Cayman were destroyed. Several schooners were driven ashore by the storm, and another bearing oil and gasoline cargo was lost. Ten people were killed after the schooner Curaçao bound for Grand Cayman sank offshore. Hundreds of cattle and swine were killed on Grand Cayman. Recently completed government buildings there were displaced from their foundations.
- 24 September 1915 - Hurricane Four brushes the Cayman Islands, causing waves bigger in size then any since the Great Havana Hurricane of 1846.
- 24 September 1917 - The 1917 Nueva Gerona hurricane strikes Grand Cayman. The storm resulted in the complete destruction of all provision grounds. Two people died, with 100 houses demolished. Fourteen vessels ran ashore with all but one being refloated.
- August, 1918 - Hurricane One also known as The Louisiana Hurricane of 1918 passes near Grand Cayman as a Tropical Storm.
- 13–14 September 1918 - Tropical Storm Six was a weakening Tropical Storm as it passed near Grand Cayman. It subsequently weakened to a Tropical Depression then dissipated about 170 mi (270 km) west of the Cayman Islands around 12:00 UTC on the 14th.

=== 1920s ===
- June, 1921 - Tropical Depression One forms near the area and moves northeast into Cuba and the Bahamas.
- October, 1921 - The 1921 Tampa Bay hurricane passes to the West of Grand Cayman, generating high winds, rain and rough seas.
- October, 1922 - Hurricane Four passes near Grand Cayman quickly strengthening from a Tropical Depression to Hurricane as it passes by.
- October, 1922 - Tropical Storm Five passes near Grand Cayman as a Tropical Storm as it was moving north.
- November, 1925 - The 1925 Florida tropical storm forms in the far northwest Caribbean and moves southeast near the Cayman area then turns northwest passing just west of Grand Cayman then on to Cuba then into Florida.
- August, 1926 - The 1926 Louisiana hurricane passes just west of Grand Cayman as a Tropical Storm.
- September, 1926 - Tropical Storm Six moves around the Cayman area as a Tropical Depression before making landfall in Cuba.
- October, 1926 - The 1926 Havana–Bermuda hurricane passes west of Grand Cayman as a Category 4 Hurricane.
- October, 1927 - Tropical Storm Six passes through the Cayman Islands as a Tropical Storm as it traveled northeast over the northwest Caribbean Seas and into Cuba.
- 30 October 1927 - Tropical Storm Seven forms over Cayman Brac and moves north east.
- August, 1928 - The 1928 Haiti hurricane passes just east of Cayman Brac and Little Cayman as a weakening Tropical Storm.
- September, 1928 - Tropical Storm Three passes just south of Grand Cayman as a Tropical Storm.

=== 1930s ===
- September, 1930 - The 1930 Dominican Republic hurricane passes near Cayman Brac and Little Cayman and just north of Grand Cayman as a Tropical storm.
- October, 1931 - Tropical Storm Ten forms in the northwest Caribbean Sea, it moved northeast and moved just northwest of Grand Cayman.
- November, 1931 - Tropical Storm Eleven formed just West southwest of Grand Cayman and stagnates in that area throughout its lifetime.
- 7 November 1932 - The 1932 Cuba hurricane passes through the Cayman Islands and passed very close to Cayman Brac as a high end Category 4 hurricane after weakening from a Category 5 just before the eye passed by. On Cayman Brac there was a reported pressure of 939 mbar. This hurricane remains the deadliest hurricane in Cayman history killing around 109 people. The hurricane also became the second most destructive hurricane to impact the Cayman Islands following behind 2004's Hurricane Ivan.
- 2 July 1933 - The 1933 Trinidad hurricane passes through Grand Cayman causing storm surges and damaging what was left after the 1932 Cuba hurricane devastated the area.
- 16–17 August 1933 - Tropical Storm Seven formed in the Eastern Caribbean on the 14th and treked West to West North West across the Caribbean. Tropical Storm Seven made landfall over Eastern Grand Cayman during late and into early hours of the 16th to 17th and moves away from Cayman later that day.
- 3 October 1933 - The 1933 Cuba-Bahamas hurricane formed in the Western Caribbean E of Eastern Honduras on the 1st. It quickly became a hurricane West of Jamaica and South of Grand Cayman. Hurricane passed on the West side of Grand Cayman as it continued to strengthen. Hurricane left the Cayman area late evening of the 3rd into early hours of the 4th.
- 27 September 1935 - The 1935 Cuba hurricane passes through Little Cayman and Cayman Brac. There were reports of houses destroyed in Cayman Brac.
- 12 August 1938 - Hurricane Three passes over Grand Cayman as a Category 2 Hurricane. Winds in Grand Cayman topped at 95 mph (153 km/h), destroying nine houses and injuring several people.
- 24 August 1938 - Hurricane Four passes near Grand Cayman with winds reaching 56 mph (90 km/h) on Grand Cayman.
- November, 1938 - Tropical Storm Nine passes near Grand Cayman as a weakening storm.
- 31 October 1939 - Hurricane Six passes over Grand Cayman and just south of Cayman Brac and Little Cayman. In Grand Cayman, winds from the storm reached 92 miles per hour (148 km/h) with a minimum pressure of 990.0 hectopascals (29.23 inHg). The storm caused considerable damage on the Cayman Islands.

=== 1940s ===
- August, 1942 - The 1942 Matagorda hurricane passes Grand Cayman just to the southwest as a Tropical Storm and intensifies to a hurricane west of Grand Cayman.
- November, 1942 - The 1942 Belize hurricane passes Grand Cayman to the northwest as it was moving southwest across the area.
- 26 October 1943 - Tropical Storm Ten forms in the West Caribbean making landfall in Belize before backtracking to the east and eventually weakening near Grand Cayman before transitioning into a post-tropical cyclone about 130 mi (210 km) southwest of the Cayman Islands by 06:00 UTC on 26 October.
- 21 August 1944 - The 1944 Jamaica hurricane passes near Grand Cayman as a Hurricane, producing measured gusts of 80–90 mph (130–140 km/h).
- 15 October 1944 - The 1944 Cuba-Florida hurricane passes through Grand Cayman bringing four days of torrential rains that produced rainfall totals reaching 31.29 inches (795 mm) on Grand Cayman that flooded Cayman becoming the rainiest Tropical cyclone to hit the Cayman Islands, causing hurricane-force winds up to 116 miles per hour, rough seas and causing sand to submerge West Bay Road several feet deep.
- 12 October 1945 - Hurricane Eleven moves over the Cayman Islands as a Hurricane before moving into Cuba.
- 21 September 1947 - Tropical Storm Six "How" moves northwest and slowly intensifies as it passes near Cayman Brac.
- 19 September 1948 - The September 1948 Florida hurricane forms near Jamaica then moves over Grand Cayman as quickly intensifies to a Hurricane. Offshore Grand Cayman, the British steamer Lochmonar, with 72 people aboard, encounters the hurricane on 19 September. The ship ran aground in seas that were "as rough as hell". They were safely rescued by a United States Coast Guard tugboat on 20 September.

=== 1950s ===
- 1 September 1950 - Hurricane Easy forms as a Tropical Storm just West of Grand Cayman.
- 16 October 1950 - Hurricane King forms in the West Caribbean and moves East over the northwest Caribbean Seas passing just southeast of Cayman Brac and Little Cayman.
- 18 August 1951 - Hurricane Charlie passes near Grand Cayman bringing hurricane conditions with Grand Cayman reporting peak wind gusts of 92 mph (148 km/h) as it was intensifying.
- 14 October 1951 - A Tropical Storm Item forms southwest of Jamaica on 12 October, it intensified on 13 October. It turned toward the north, and the next day attained peak winds of 65 mph (105 km/h) after moving near Grand Cayman.
- 23 October 1952 - Hurricane Fox moves near Grand Cayman as a Category 3 Hurricane.
- 29–30 May 1953 - Tropical Storm Alice (1953) formed in the South West Caribbean on the 25th and moved generally North over the Western Caribbean passing just West of Grand Cayman late on 29th through the 30th.
- 23 September 1953 - Hurricane Florence passes near Grand Cayman to the southwest as a Tropical Storm.
- 15 September 1955 - Hurricane Hilda makes landfall in Grand Cayman and produces winds of 55 mph (89 km/h) on Grand Cayman.
- 4–5 October 1958 - Hurricane Janice formed on the late morning of the 4th just South of Grand Cayman as Tropical Depression and quickly became Tropical Storm Janice. from the overnight to early hours 4th to 5th Janice made landfall on Grand Cayman Janice moved out of the Cayman area late on the 5th.

=== 1960s ===
- 29 October 1961 - Hurricane Hattie passes just South West of Grand Cayman bringing heavy rainfall. At least 11.5 inches (290 mm) of rain were reported on the island, including 7.8 inches (200 mm) in six hours. Winds on Grand Cayman were not very strong, and only minor damage was reported due to the rain.
- 28 June 1966 - Unnamed Tropical Storm forms as Tropical Depression just West of North West Grand Cayman.
- 31 May 1969 - Tropical Depression forms in South West Caribbean around 29 May and moves north to North North East passing near Grand Cayman on 31 May.
- 8 June 1969 - Tropical Depression forms just SW of Grand Cayman moving North passing close to Western Grand Cayman.
- 14 August 1969 - Hurricane Camille Forms and passed near Cayman Islands.
- 29 August 1969 - Hurricane Francelia passes near Grand Cayman bringing heavy rainfall with 0.56in within a 16hrs period.

=== 1970s ===
- 21–23 May 1970 - The slow moving Hurricane Alma moves through the Cayman Islands.
- 14–18 November 1971 - The slow moving Tropical Storm Laura moves near Grand Cayman causing 3in of rain.
- 16–18 October 1973 - Tropical Storm Gilda (1973) Formed as Tropical Depression South of Grand Cayman near the mid way point between Jamaica Honduras and Grand Cayman. the Depression slowly moved North North Eastwards and strengthens to Tropical Storm about 60 miles E of Grand Cayman and just before making landfall on Cayman Brac in the overnight into morning hours of 17–18 October. Gilda moved away from Cayman after that.
- 26 August 1975 - Hurricane Caroline moves through Cayman Islands.
- 19 September 1975 - The eye of Hurricane Eloise moves near Cayman Islands.
- 17 October 1977 - Tropical Storm Frieda moves near Grand Cayman caused 5.42in of rain in 36hrs.
- 11–13 June 1979 - Tropical Depression One Formed around 230 miles South of Grand Cayman. the Depression slowly drifted North East passing close to Cayman Brac through the overnight into early morning hours 12 to 13 June and leaving the Cayman area later on the 13th.
- 16 October 1979 - Tropical Depression Fourteen moves near Grand Cayman.

=== 1980s ===
- 6 August 1980 - Hurricane Allen moves over Cayman Brac and Little Cayman, passing along north coast of Grand Cayman. Allen brings 135 mile per hour winds, which causes damage to houses and utility poles.
- 7 May 1981 - Tropical Storm Arlene (1981) forms west of Grand Cayman on the 6th. The Arlene system moves east passing just south of Grand Cayman and near Little Cayman and Cayman Brac before moving to Cuba. The system brought Tropical Storm Conditions to the Islands.
- 6 November 1981 - Hurricane Katrina (1981) Forms 150 miles South of Grand Cayman. As it moves North it passes near to Grand Cayman causing a foot of flooding. Cayman Brac experiences a tornado which causes damage to foliage at the Brac Reef Hotel bar.
- 12 August 1985 - Hurricane Danny (1985) Formed just South of Grand Cayman as a Tropical Depression in the early hours of 12, August during the remainder of the morning the Depression had a near direct hit on Grand Cayman with its poorly organised circulation. the Depression moved away from Grand Cayman later that day.
- 1 November 1987 - Tropical Depression Fourteen (1987) Formed South of Jamaica on 31 October and moved North West and made a direct landfall on Little Cayman the Morning of 1 November.
- 13 September 1988 - Hurricane Gilbert passes through Grand Cayman bringing winds up to 156 miles per hour.

=== 1990s ===
- 17 October 1996 - Hurricane Lili passes to the northeast of Grand Cayman.
- 25 November 1996 - Hurricane Marco passes southwest of Grand Cayman as a tropical storm.
- 25 October 1998 - Hurricane Mitch passes southwest of Grand Cayman as a Category 5 hurricane. Damage is moderate to light with a few blown-out windows, beach erosion, damaged docks, one sunken dive vessel, and it forces flights to be cancelled.
- 13 October 1999 - Hurricane Irene passes just to the west of Grand Cayman.
- 13 November 1999 - Hurricane Lenny forms south of the Cayman Islands.

== 2000s ==
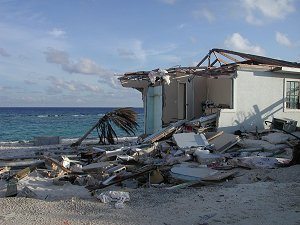
Damage from Hurricane Ivan in the Cayman Islands

- 19 September 2000 - Tropical Storm Helene passes through the Cayman Islands producing strong winds, rain, and rough seas.
- 7 October 2001 - Hurricane Iris hits Central America bringing heavy rain and strong winds to the Cayman Islands.
- 4 November 2001 - Hurricane Michelle passes Grand Cayman, Producing strong winds, heavy rains, rough seas and high storm surge especially on the southwest and the north coast of Grand Cayman.
- 9 September 2002 - Hurricane Isidore passes through the Cayman Islands causing tropical storm force winds.
- 30 September 2002 - Hurricane Lili passes over Little Cayman and Cayman Brac hitting the Cayman Islands as a category 1 hurricane.
- 12 August 2004 - Hurricane Charley passes between Grand Cayman and its sister islands of Cayman Brac and Little Cayman bringing rains, strong winds and rough seas.
- 12 September 2004 - Hurricane Ivan passes about 25 miles (40 km) southwest of George Town as a Category 5 hurricane. The town reported sustained winds of 150 mph (240 km/h). The storm surge from the hurricane flooded all of Grand Cayman Island. Ivan killed two people in the Cayman Islands, and left US$2.86 billion in damage.
- 9 June 2005 - Tropical Storm Arlene becomes an eastern bound storm as the center of the storm passes just west of Grand Cayman, causing heavy rains and tropical storm force winds.
- 8 July 2005 - Hurricane Dennis passes near Cayman Brac and Little Cayman.
- 17 July 2005 - Hurricane Emily passes by Grand Cayman as a major hurricane. producing heavy rains, strong winds, rough seas and storm surge.
- 18 October 2005 - Hurricane Wilma forms just Southeast of the Cayman Islands and just offshore of Jamaica and moves slowly around the Cayman area and rapidly intensified from a tropical Storm to a Category 5 Hurricane around 18 and 19 October. producing heavy rains, strong winds, rough seas and storm surge.
- 10 June 2006 - Subtropical Storm Alberto forms just west of Grand Cayman, producing heavy rainfall across the area. A station on Grand Cayman reported 22.72 inches (577 mm) of rain in a 24-hour period.
- 20 August 2007 - Hurricane Dean a strong category 4 Hurricane passes Grand Cayman to South and West producing heavy rains, heavy winds, rough seas, and storm surge.
- 13 December 2007 - Tropical Storm Olga (2007) Remnants move through the Cayman Islands causing some rains and strong winds.
- 20 July 2008 - Hurricane Dolly forms just off Southwest Grand Cayman it brought heavy rains and strong winds to Grand Cayman.
- 17 August 2008 - Tropical Storm Fay passes near Cayman Brac, bringing storm conditions and rains and rough seas.
- 30 August 2008 - Hurricane Gustav moves through the Cayman Islands.
- 8 September 2008 - Hurricane Ike crosses southeast Cuba and enters the northwest Caribbean Sea bringing storm conditions to the Cayman Islands.
- 8 November 2008 - Hurricane Paloma makes a near landfall on Grand Cayman as a major hurricane and makes landfall on Cayman Brac as Category 4 hurricane. Hurricane cause moderate damage to Grand Cayman and serious damage to Cayman Brac.
- 7 November 2009 - Hurricane Ida passes just west of Grand Cayman bringing heavy rains and strong winds as well as rough seas.

=== 2010s ===
- 28 September 2010 - Tropical Storm Nicole causes heavy rain.
- 24 October 2011 - Hurricane Rina passes to the southwest and west of Grand Cayman Causing moderate to heavy rains.
- 6 August 2012 - Hurricane Ernesto passes to the southwest of Grand Cayman causing heavy rains strong winds and rough seas.
- 2 August 2016 - Hurricane Earl passes to the south and west of Grand Cayman, bringing heavy rains, strong winds and rough seas.
- 17 June 2017 - Tropical Storm Cindy Tropical Disturbance develops into Tropical Storm Cindy causing heavy rains in Grand Cayman.
- 7 August 2017 - Hurricane Franklin passes to the southwest of Grand Cayman causing heavy rains.
- 21 August 2017 - Hurricane Harvey in a weakened state passes to the south and west of Grand Cayman causing stormy skies and moderate to heavy showers.
- 6 October 2017 - Hurricane Nate passes to the West of Grand Cayman, bands causing heavy rains and strong winds.
- 28 October 2017 - Tropical Storm Philippe passes by Grand Cayman, bringing heavy rains and tropical storm force winds.
- 7 October 2018 - Hurricane Michael forms to the West of Grand Cayman and moves North, causing heavy rains, strong winds and rough seas.

=== 2020s ===
- 24 August 2020 - Hurricane Laura passes to the northeast of Cayman Brac, Little Cayman, and Grand Cayman, bringing heavy rains and rough seas that beach and sink small crafts at Grand Cayman and brings storm force winds to Cayman Brac and Little Cayman.
- 21 August 2020 - Tropical Storm Marco passes to the south and west of Grand Cayman, bringing rains and strong winds.
- 1 September 2020 - Tropical Storm Nana passes to the south of Grand Cayman, bringing rains and strong winds.
- 2 October 2020 - Triopical Storm Gamma passes to the south and west of Grand Cayman, bringing heavy rains.
- 6 October 2020 - Hurricane Delta rapidly intensifies to a Category 4 hurricane about 200 km from the islands on 6 October, with its closest approach to Grand Cayman just after reaching category 4 intensity. The storm caused little impact other than wave action, but government-driven safety preparations were intense due to COVID-19 effectively shutting down the country for 48 hours. Grand Cayman was affected with heavy rains, strong winds, rough seas and minor storm surge that damaged a few seaside docks on the south side of the island.
- 24–26 October 2020 - Hurricane Zeta caused heavy rains and rough seas, as well as strong winds for Grand Cayman.
- 1–2 November and 7–8, 2020 - Tropical Storm Eta brings tropical storm force winds and reports of a tornado ripping up power poles and trees. Eta caused moderate flooding and storm surge. A little over 20,000 customers lose power. Along with CERT Teams, The Cayman Islands Regiment was deployed to the area to assist with evacuations and recovery operations.
- 4–5 July 2021 - Tropical Storm Elsa impacted the islands with heavy rain and strong winds causing flash floods and outages.
- 18 August 2021 - Hurricane Grace impacted all of the Cayman Island, a direct hit on Grand Cayman, which caused damage to all of Grand Cayman, and some minor impacts to Little Cayman and Cayman Brac. Grace caused some heavy rainfall and storm surge flooding to parts of Grand Cayman. The Cayman Islands Regiment was deployed on HADR mission to rescue persons and to clear the blocked roads and clear debris.
- 26–27 August 2021 - Hurricane Ida impacted all 3 islands with a near landfall occurring on the eastern portion of Grand Cayman. The worst of the impacts were felt on Cayman Brac and Little Cayman. The Cayman Islands Regiment were deployed to all of the Islands.
- 25–27 September 2022 - Hurricane Ian impacted all the islands but impacted Grand Cayman the most. The Cayman Islands Regiment saw full deployment of the Regiment the Cayman Islands Coast Guard was also deployed and addition support by the deployed Royal Navy HMS Medway.
- 1 November 2022 - Hurricane Lisa impacted Grand Cayman and no impacts to Little Cayman and Cayman Brac. Impacts were considered to be mild with some moderate showers and occasional gusty winds as well as some rough seas. A Tropical Storm Watch was issued for Grand Cayman only.
- 26–28 August 2023 - Hurricane Idalia became a tropical storm several-hundred miles north-west, and brought rough seas, and strong winds up to 35 mph to Grand Cayman. Idalia also brought 2 inches of rain causing flooding. minor damage was recorded.
- 3–4 July 2024 - Hurricane Beryl impacted all of the Cayman Islands but impacted Grand Cayman the greatest, making its closest approach to Grand Cayman as a Major Hurricane. Beryl produced heavy rainfall that caused flooding especially in low lying areas. Winds up to 75 mph were recorded in Grand Cayman, with gusts of over 100 mph. Storm surge as high as 4 feet and waves of 15 feet. Just under 4000 people evacuated the Cayman Islands prior to Beryl. Several hundreds of persons evacuated to government shelters. Moderate to Major damage was recorded especially along the Southern Coasts of the Island. over 3000 customers lost power and water supplies was shut off. The Cayman Islands Regiment and Cayman Islands Coast Guard was fully deployed, with additional support from the Royal Navy ship HMS Trent (P224) which was also deployed to Grand Cayman.
- 2–4 August 2024 - Hurricane Debby passed between Cayman Islands and Cuba as a Tropical Depression late 2 August into early 3 August. The system passed closer to the Sister Islands than it was to Grand Cayman, Passing 85 miles from Cayman Brac and 165 miles from Grand Cayman. Impacts were Minor as outer bands on the South side of the storm brought some thunderstorms with scattered to moderate showers and some gusty winds in and around heavier showers. Some moderate surf at the coast. Late on 3 August into early 4 August far reaching Southern outer bands of then Tropical Storm Debby brought renewed Thunderstorms and scattered to moderate showers to Grand Cayman but especially for the Sister Islands.
- 23–26 September 2024 - Hurricane Helene Developed as Potential Tropical Cyclone Nine in the Western Caribbean and moved close to the Cayman Islands later became Tropical Storm Helene. Tropical Storm Warning were issued for Grand Cayman. Significant heavy rains brought Flooding to the Cayman Islands and brought Tropical Storm conditions to the islands, along with rough seas. The Cayman Islands Regiment was Deployed for HADR Operations.
- 5–6 November 2024 - Hurricane Rafael developed in the West-Central Caribbean South of Jamaica as Potential Tropical Cyclone Eighteen. It went on to develop into Tropical Depression and further to Tropical Storm Rafael on the 4th and approached Jamaica. The storm rapidly developed into a Hurricane after it passed by West Jamaica was approaching the Cayman Islands. The Hurricane had a direct Hit on Little Cayman late night on the 5th and passed close North of Grand Cayman early morning on the 6th. Little Cayman was impacted the greatest with significant power outages, buildings damaged, there were a number of boats that sunk. Cayman Brac also was impacted but not as much as Little Cayman. Minimal impacts occurred in Grand Cayman. Cayman Islands Regiment was deployed across the Islands to assist with the Humanitarian Aid and Disaster Relief Mission.
- 27–28 October 2025 - Hurricane Melissa makes landfall in Jamaica and brings heavy winds, rainfall, and huge waves to The Cayman Islands. No injuries or deaths reported.

== Climatology ==
Storms affecting the Cayman Islands by month
Month	Number of storms
May	4
June	8
July	7
August	34
September	28
October	40
November	17
December	1

Storms affecting the Cayman Islands by period 1700s-1900s
Period	Number of storms
1700s	5
1800s	0
1810s	1
1820s	0
1830s	2
1840s	1
1850s	2
1860s	4
1870s	8
1880s	14
1890s	12

Storms affecting the Cayman Islands by period 1900s-Current
Period	Number of storms
1900s	10
1910s	7
1920s	12
1930s	12
1940s	8
1950s	9
1960s	6
1970s	8
1980s	6
1990s	5
2000s	20
2010s	10
2020s	18

Storms affecting the Cayman Islands by El Niño–Southern Oscillation (ENSO) Years 1950- Present
Period	Number of storms
El Nino	12
Neutral	15
La Nina	41

== Deadliest Caymanian storms ==
List of Atlantic tropical storms that caused fatalities in the Cayman Islands

Name	Year	Number of deaths
Unnamed	1932	109
Ivan	2004	2
Four	1917	2
Two	1915	1
Unnamed	1785	Many lives Num. Unknown

== Storms with high rainfall ==
List of Atlantic tropical storms and hurricanes that produced the highest amount of rainfall in the Cayman Islands

Wettest tropical cyclones and their remnants in the Cayman Islands Highest-known totals
Precipitation			Storm	Location	Ref.
Rank	mm	in	Storm	Location	Ref.
1	794.8	31.29	Unnamed, 1944	Grand Cayman Island	
2	577	22.72	Alberto, 2006	Grand Cayman Islands, Owen Roberts International Airport	
3	552.2	21.74	Isidore, 2002	Cayman Brac	
4	451.4	17.77	Paloma, 2008	Cayman Brac	
5	312.9	12.32	"Monterrey" Hurricane, 1909	Grand Cayman Island	
6	308.4	12.14	Ivan, 2004	Grand Cayman Island	
7	292.1	11.50	Hattie, 1961	Grand Cayman Island	
8	280.0	11.02	Rafael, 2024	Cayman Brac	
9	250.7	9.87	Eta, 2020	Grand Cayman Island, Owen Roberts International Airport	
10	229.1	9.02	Nicole, 2010	Grand Cayman Island, Owen Roberts International Airport	
11	193.0	7.60	Grace, 2021	Grand Cayman Island, Owen Roberts International Airport	
12	165.6	6.52	Michelle, 2001	Grand Cayman Island	
13	138.0	5.42	Frieda, 1977	Grand Cayman Island	

== See also ==
- List of Cuba hurricanes
- List of Jamaica hurricanes
- List of Hispaniola hurricanes
- Hurricanes in the Bahama Archipelago
