= List of Cuba hurricanes =

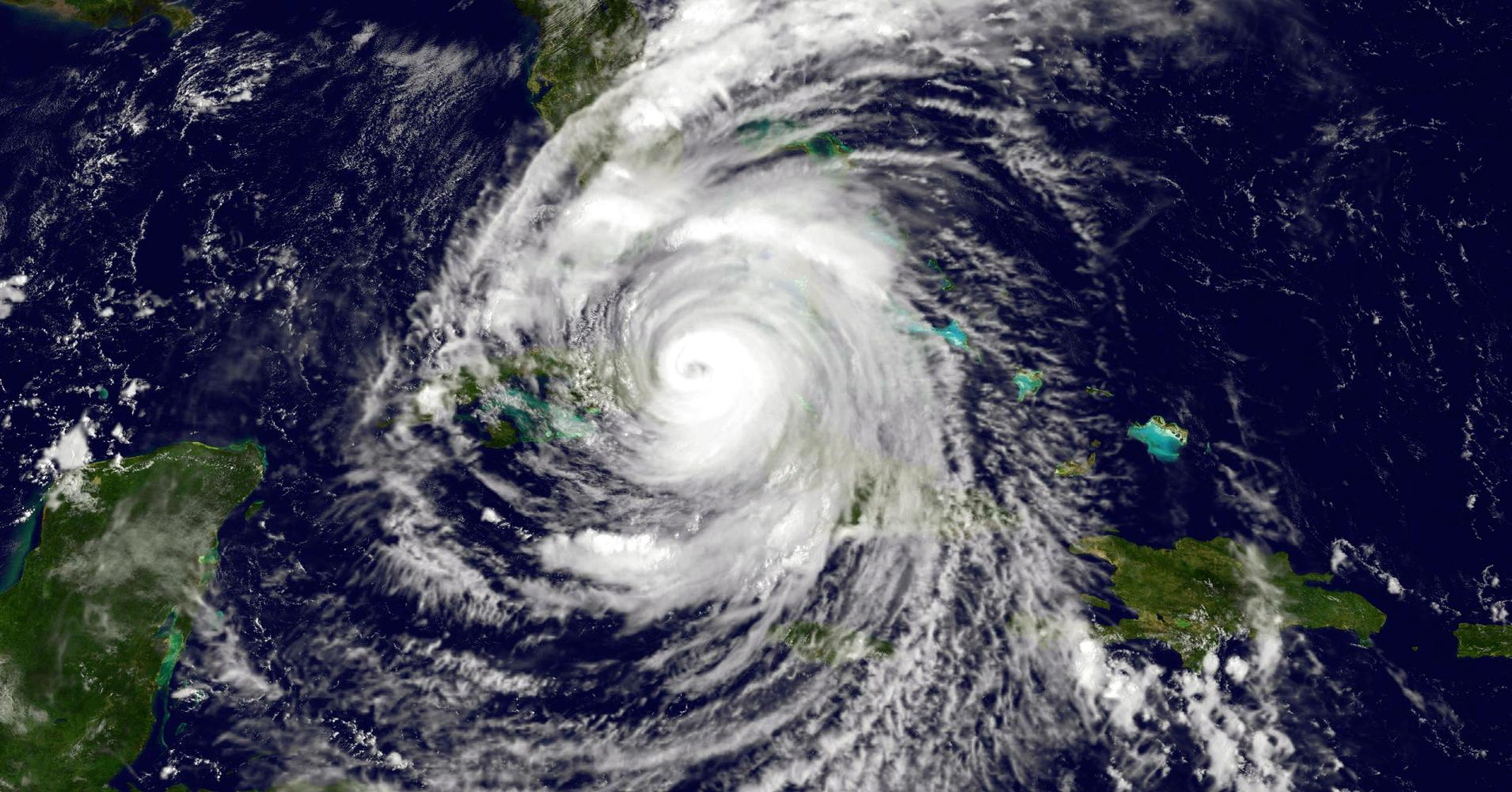
Satellite image of Hurricane Irma striking northern Cuba

Cuba is an island country east of the Yucatán Peninsula of Mexico, south of both the U.S. state of Florida and the Bahamas, west of Haiti and north of both Jamaica and the Cayman Islands. The country has experienced the effects of at least 54 Atlantic hurricanes, or storms that were once tropical or subtropical cyclones, including 37 since 2000. The storms collectively killed 5,613 people, most of them related to a powerful hurricane in 1932.

== 1800s ==
- October 10, 1846 - A powerful hurricane, possibly a Category 5, moved across Cuba. The high winds destroyed crops, houses, and nearly every boat in Havana harbor. Dozens to hundreds of people were killed across Cuba.

== 1900s ==
- October 14, 1910 - Known locally as the "Cyclone of the Five Days", a hurricane struck western Cuba, executed a small loop, and passed again near the western end of the island five days later. The storm killed at least 100 people, possibly as high as 700, and left more than US$1 million in damage in Havana alone.
- October 19, 1924 - A Category 5 hurricane struck extreme western Cuba.
- October 20, 1926 - A Category 4 hurricane crossed western Cuba, killing 600 people.
- November 9, 1932 - A Category 4 hurricane hit Camagüey Province and moved northeastward across the island. The hurricane washed away much of the town of Santa Cruz del Sur from its 6.5 m (21.3 ft) storm surge. Across Cuba, the storm killed 3,033 people and left US$40 million in damage.
- September 1, 1933 - A hurricane brushed the northern coast of Cuba while moving westward, producing flooding and damaging winds. The storm damaged ships and houses, leaving about 100,000 people homeless. Damage was estimated at US$11 million, and there were about 70 deaths in the country.
- October 4, 1933 - A hurricane crossed western Cuba in the midst of political upheaval, and four people were killed by soldiers for suspect of looting.
- September 28, 1935 - A hurricane crossed central Cuba, killing 35 people and leaving US$12 million in damage.
- October 22, 1935 - A hurricane struck southeastern Cuba and later drifted back southwestward over the Caribbean. The storm killed four people.
- October 18, 1944 - A hurricane struck the western tip of Cuba, producing a wind gust of 163 mph (262 km/h) in Havana. Seven people died across Cuba from the storm.
- October 22, 1950 - Hurricane King crossed the eastern portion of the island. The hurricane killed seven people and caused $2 million (1950 USD) in damage throughout the country.
- October 24, 1952 - Hurricane Fox crossed central Cuba, killing 600 people and leaving US$10 million in damage.
- October 4, 1963 - Hurricane Flora made landfall in southeastern Cuba, and over the next four days drifted across the country. Santiago de Cuba recorded 100.39 in (2,550 mm) of rainfall from Flora, which is the highest rainfall total measured on Cuba from any rainfall event on record. Flora killed 1,750 people and left US$300 million in damage.
- August 26, 1964 - Hurricane Cleo crossed eastern Cuba, causing one fatality and US$2 million in damage.
- June 8, 1966 - Hurricane Alma crossed Isla de la Juventud and later mainland Cuba. Alma killed 12 people and left US$200 million in damage.
- June 3, 1982 - Hurricane Alberto strengthened off Cuba's northwest coast, dropping torrential rainfall on the island that peaked at 39.84 inches (1012 mm). The floods damaged 8,745 houses and downed about 250,000 banana trees. Alberto killed 24 people and left US$85 million in damage.
- September 23, 1998 - Hurricane Georges struck southeastern Cuba and proceeded to move across much of the country over the next two days. Georges dropped torrential rainfall, reaching 24.41 inches (620 mm) in Limonar in Guantánamo Province. The hurricane killed six people and left US$305.8 million in damage.

== 2000s ==
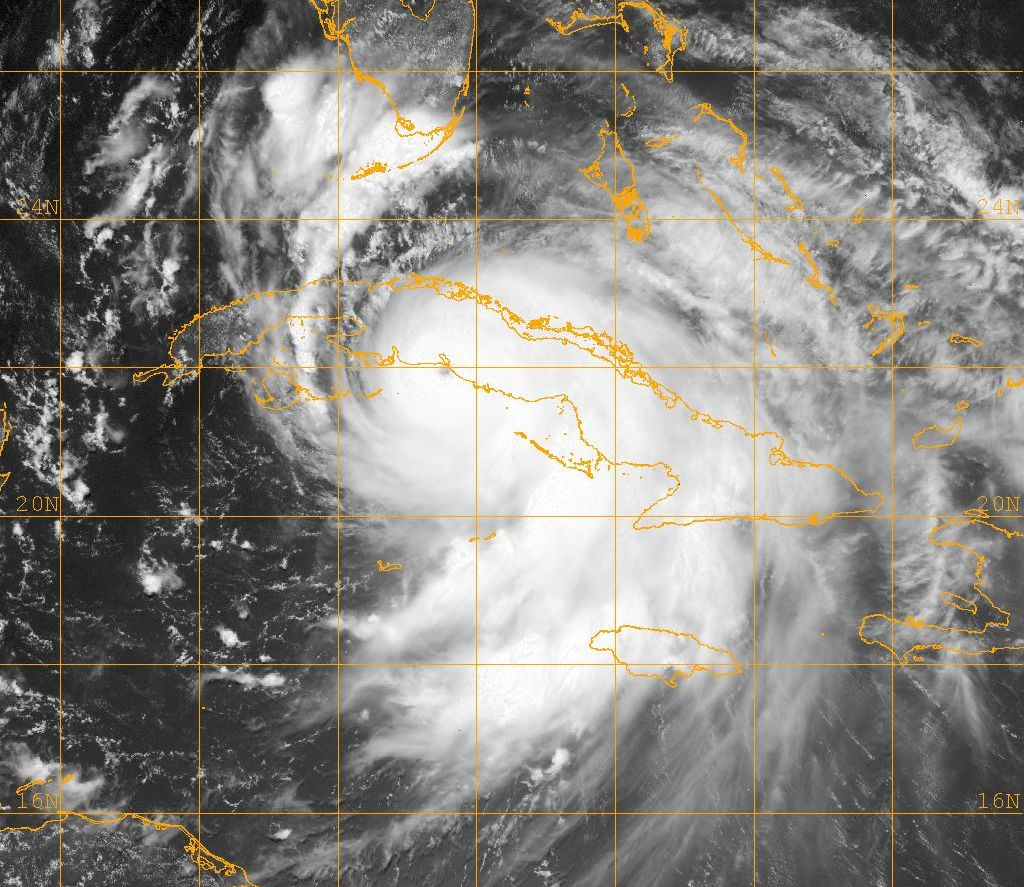
Hurricane Dennis shortly before making landfall in Matanzas Province, Cuba, on July 8 as a Category 4

=== 2000s ===
- August 24, 2000 – Tropical Storm Debby dissipated south of eastern Cuba. The storm dropped 3.22 inches (82 mm) of rainfall in 24 hours in San Antonio del Sur. Wind gusts reached 42 mph (68 km/h) at Maisí.
- September 16, 2000 – As Tropical Storm Gordon struck western Florida, its large circulation dropped heavy rainfall in western Cuba, with totals reaching 10 inches (250 mm).
- September 20, 2000 – Tropical Depression Helene moved across extreme western Cuba as a weak system.
- November 4, 2001 – Hurricane Michelle made landfall on Cayo Largo del Sur as a Category 4 hurricane with winds of 140 mph (220 km/h); this was followed shortly after with a landfall on the Bay of Pigs five hours later with winds of 135 mph (215 km/h). This was the strongest Cuban landfall since Fox in 1952. Michelle destroyed about 10,000 homes and killed five people in Cuba. Damage in the country totaled US$2 billion.
- September 20, 2002 – Hurricane Isidore struck Cabo France in western Cuba. The hurricane dropped heavy rainfall, reaching 21.7 inches (550 mm) at Isabel Rubio in western Cuba.
- October 1, 2002 – Hurricane Lili struck the Isle of Youth and near Pinar del Río as a Category 2 hurricane. Lili damaged about 48,000 houses, and killed one person. Damage from Isidore and Lili totaled US$800 million.
- October 16, 2002 - Tropical Depression Fourteen moved ashore near Cienfuegos, and was absorbed by a cold front while moving across the island. The depression dropped heavy rainfall across Cuba.
- August 13, 2004 - Hurricane Charley made landfall in western Cuba as a Category 3 hurricane, and weakened while moving northward across the island. Playa Cajio, near where the storm moved ashore, recorded a 13.1 ft (4.0 m) storm surge. Wind gusts at Playa Baracoa reached 150 mph (241 km/h). At least 70,290 homes and about 3,000 agricultural buildings were either damaged or destroyed. Roughly 95% of sugar cane, bean, and banana crops were ruined. There were four deaths and US$923 million in damage.
- September 14, 2004 - Hurricane Ivan passed through the Yucatán Channel about 17 miles (28 km) southwest of Cabo San Antonio, where a station reported wind gusts of 120 mph (192 km/h). Rainfall in Cuba reached 13.33 in (339 mm) at Isabel Rubio. Ivan left heavy housing and agriculture damage in western Cuba, with monetary damage estimated at US$1.2 billion.
- June 10, 2005 - Tropical Storm Arlene crossed western Cuba, forcing school closures and bringing beneficial rainfall.
- July 8, 2005 - Hurricane Dennis made two landfalls on Cuba as a Category 4 hurricane, in Granma and Matanzas provinces. Cape Cruz recorded wind gusts of 148 mph (239 km/h), although stronger winds could have occurred there. Dennis killed 16 people in Cuba, and left US$1.4 billion in damage. Rainfall on the island reached 1,092 mm (43.0 in), resulting in 35,000 landslides across the country. The hurricane damaged agriculture, tourist areas, and electrical infrastructure.
- August 29, 2005 - Hurricane Katrina emerged from Florida into the eastern Gulf of Mexico. Its large circulation brought tropical storm force winds to western Cuba, along with over 8 in (200 mm) of rainfall, causing scattered power outages.
- September 20, 2005 - Hurricane Rita moved through the Straits of Florida while remaining north of Cuba. The hurricane inundated parts of Havana, leaving around 400,000 people without power.
- October 23, 2005 - Hurricane Wilma passed northwest of western Cuba while moving northeastward toward Florida. The hurricane produced wind gusts of 84 mph (135 km/h), along with a significant storm surge. Wilma left US$704 million in damage, which included flooding damage in Havana, as well as more than 7,000 destroyed houses.

Satellite image of Hurricane Gustav approaching western Cuba

- June 10, 2006 - Tropical Storm Alberto formed west of the western tip of Cuba. Its large circulation dropped heavy rainfall in Cuba, reaching 17.52 inches (445 mm) in Pinar del Río province. The storm damaged about 50 houses across the country.
- August 6, 2006 - The circulation of former Tropical Storm Chris dissipated near Havana, bringing heavy rainfall to parts of the country.
- August 28, 2006 - Tropical Storm Ernesto moved across eastern Cuba, dropping 7.46 in (189 mm) of rainfall in Nuevitas. There were scattered power outages across the region.
- June 1, 2007 - Tropical Storm Barry formed off the western tip of Cuba. The storm dropped 12.0 inches (305 mm) of rainfall in Sancti Spíritus Province, causing flooding; the storm also spawned four tornadoes.
- August 18, 2007 - Officials evacuated residents in southeastern Cuba ahead of Hurricane Dean, although the hurricane ended up passing to the south of the country.
- October 30, 2007 - Tropical Storm Noel drifted across eastern Cuba. The storm dropped more than 12.2 in (310 mm) of rainfall, producing the worst flooding in the country since Hurricane Flora. Noel damaged or destroyed 22,000 homes, and also damaged coffee plantations, infrastructure, roads, and power lines. Damage was estimated at US$500 million, and one person died in the country due to the flooding.
- August 17, 2008 - Tropical Storm Fay struck Granma Province, and a day later moved across central Cuba. The storm dropped 18.27 in (464 mm) of rainfall in Agabama. The storm flooded low-lying areas in the southern portion of the country.
- August 30, 2008 - Hurricane Gustav made landfall first on Isla de la Juventud, and later that day in Pinar del Río Province, both as a Category 4 hurricane. In the latter province, Gustav produced sustained winds of 155 mph (250 km/h), as well as a wind gust of 212 mph (340 km/h); this marked the highest recorded surface wind gust in the northern hemisphere and western hemisphere related to a tropical cyclone. Gustav also dropped heavy rainfall, reaching 11.7 in (297 mm). The hurricane left US$2.097 billion in damage in the country, including losses to power lines, houses, health facilities, and banana plantations.
- September 2, 2008 - High waves from Hurricane Hanna flooded coastal areas of eastern Cuba.
- September 8, 2008 - Hurricane Ike made landfall as a Category 4 in Holguín province, the strongest landfall there since 1799. A day later, Ike made a second landfall in western Cuba, after brushing the country's southern coast. Ike killed seven people throughout Cuba, and imparted US$7.325 billion in damage. High waters flooded coastal areas up to 400 m (1,300 ft) inland where Ike first moved ashore. The storm wrecked 1,638 km (1,018 mi) of roads. Ike affected nearly the entire country, causing widespread damage to power lines, health facilities, radio towers, and agriculture.
- November 9, 2008 - Hurricane Paloma made landfall as a Category 2 near Santa Cruz del Sur in Camagüey, and subsequently drifted across the country. Wind gusts reached 121 mph (194 km/h) in Santa Cruz del Sur. Damage was estimated at US$300 million. About 8,600 houses were damaged.
- November 8, 2009 - Hurricane Ida passed between Cuba and the Yucatán peninsula. The eastern periphery of the hurricane moved across Cuba, dropping heavy rainfall reaching 12.5 in (320 mm) in Manuel Lazo.

=== 2010s ===
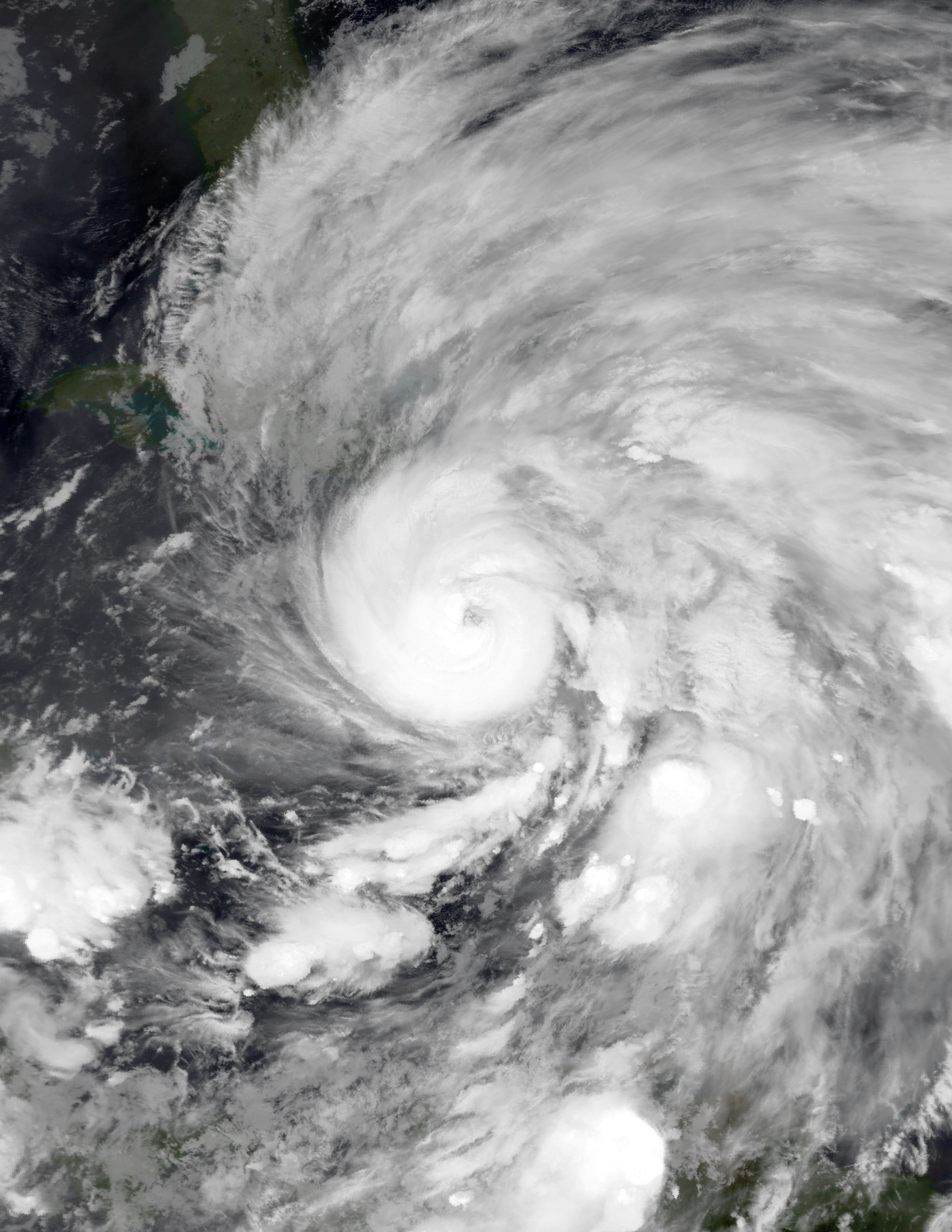
Satellite image of Hurricane Sandy approaching eastern Cuba in 2012

- September 29, 2010 - Tropical Storm Nicole lost its circulation over Cuba. The large, asymmetric storm dropped 9.22 inches (234 mm) of rainfall at Cape Cruz. Flooding blocked roads and killed livestock.
- October 14, 2010 - Tropical Storm Paula turned sharply eastward in the Gulf of Mexico and struck the northern coast of Pinar del Río Province, producing wind gusts of 68 mph (109 km/h). Paula caused minor flooding and downed a few trees.
- November 5, 2010 - Hurricane Tomas passed between Haiti and Cuba, bringing gusty winds to eastern Cuba.
- August 5, 2011 - The remnants of Tropical Storm Emily moved across eastern Cuba before regenerating in The Bahamas.
- August 24, 2011 - High surf and the outer rainbands of Hurricane Irene affected eastern Cuba while the hurricane was moving through the Bahamas.
- August 25, 2012 - Tropical Storm Isaac struck eastern Cuba near Guantánamo, and proceeded to move along much of the country's northern coast. Rainfall in the country reached 14.01 in (356 mm) in San Antonio del Sur. The storm flooded dozens of houses, damaged crops, and knocked down power lines.
- October 25, 2012 - Hurricane Sandy made landfall just west of Santiago de Cuba with winds of 115 mph (185 km/h), and weakened while moving northward across the island. Sandy killed 11 people and left US$2 billion in damage across Cuba, with 226,000 homes damaged and another 17,000 destroyed. Most of the damage was near where the storm moved ashore.
- August 11, 2013 - The remnants of Tropical Storm Chantal crossed eastern Cuba.
- October 1, 2015 - Hurricane Joaquin stalled over the Bahamas as a Category 4 hurricane. The storm caused coastal flooding and damage to roofs in Cuba's Granma Province.
- August 28, 2016 - Hurricane Hermine made landfall in western Cuba as a tropical depression. Candelaria in western Cuba recorded 12.24 in (310.8 mm) from the system.
- October 5, 2016 - Hurricane Matthew made landfall in eastern Cuba near the Maisí with winds of 130 mph (215 km/h), and gusts to 152 mph (245 km/h). Damages in Cuba amounted to US$2.58 billion, most of which occurred in the Guantánamo Province. Nearly two months after the storm, a storm-damaged bridge in Moa collapsed, killing four workers that were undertaking repairs.

Satellite loop of Hurricane Matthew striking eastern Cuba

- September 9, 2017 - Hurricane Irma made landfall near Cayo Romano along Cuba's northern coast with winds of 165 mph (270 km/h). This made Irma the first Category 5 hurricane to strike Cuba since 1924. The hurricane weakened to a Category 2 while it moved along the country's northern coast. Rainfall on the island reached 23.9 in (610 mm) at Topes de Collantes. The storm also lashed Cuba with waves over 26 ft (7.9 m) in height, and the storm surge penetrated as far as 1.2 mi (1.9 km) inland in some areas of Villa Clara Province. Irma damaged 158,554 homes, of which 14,657 were destroyed. Throughout the country, the hurricane inflicted $13.185 billion in damage and killed 10 people, making Irma the costliest tropical cyclone in Cuban history.
- October 28, 2017 - Tropical Storm Philippe moved ashore western Cuba and dissipated, bringing locally heavy rainfall.
- May 26, 2018 - Subtropical Storm Alberto bypassed western Cuba while moving into the Gulf of Mexico. The storm's rainfall reached 14.41 inches (366 mm) in Villa Clara Province, causing flooding and landslides across central and western Cuba that killed 10 people.
- October 8, 2018 - Hurricane Michael brushed the western tip of Cuba as a Category 2 hurricane while entering the Gulf of Mexico. Rainfall reached 11.45 in (291 mm) in Pinar del Rio, which caused flooding and damage to crops.

=== 2020s ===
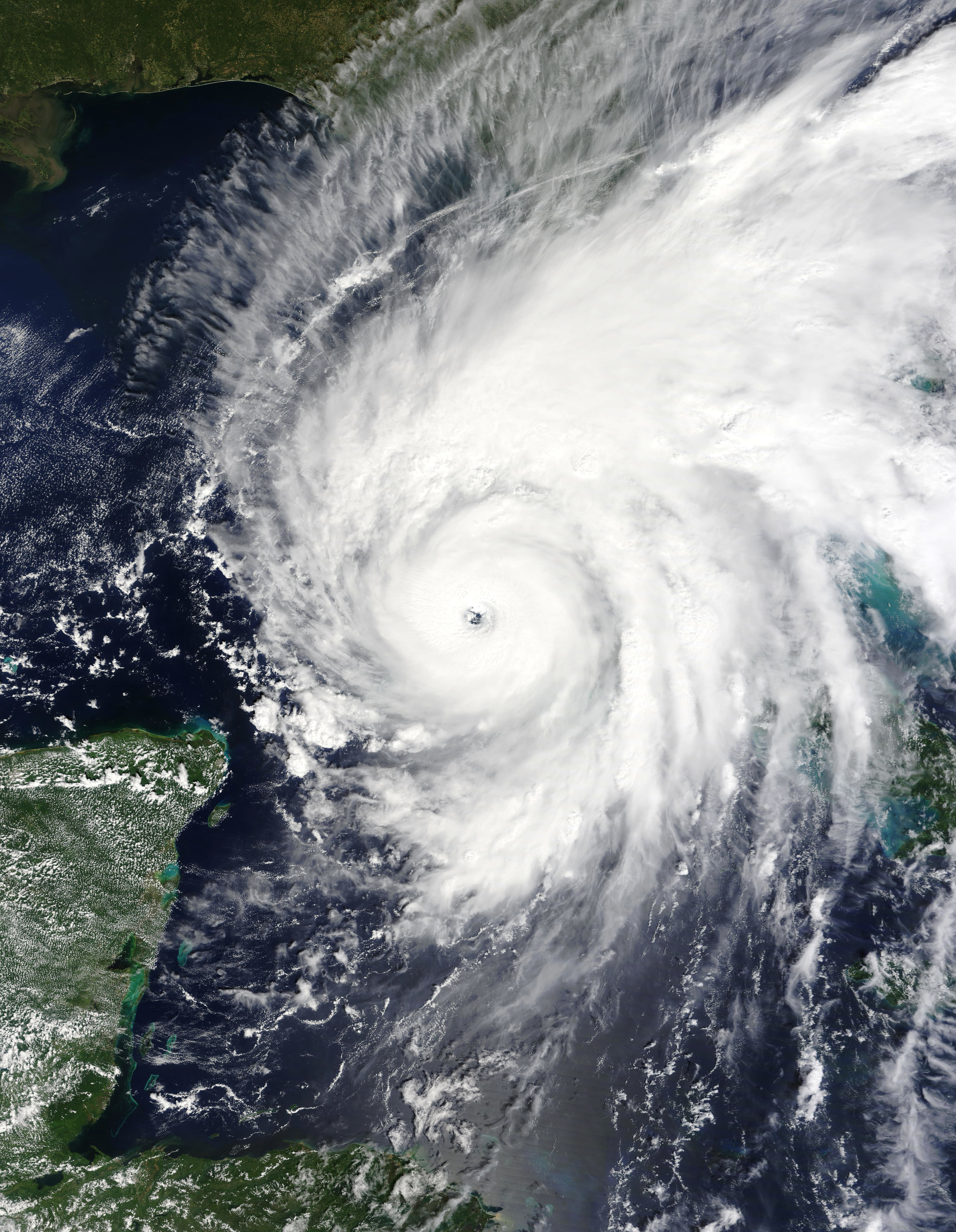
Hurricane Ian exiting western Cuba on September 27, 2022

- August 23–24, 2020 - Hurricane Laura, as a tropical storm, moved across the length of Cuba; almost 16 inches (41 cm) of rain fell in the country.
- November 8–9, 2020 - Hurricane Eta, as a tropical storm, made landfall on Sancti Spíritus Province at 09:00 UTC. Coastal zones in Cuba were flooded and about 25,000 people were forced to evacuate. There were no casualties.
- August 27, 2021 - Hurricane Ida made two landfalls in Cuba as a Category 1 hurricane, numerous palm trees were downed in Isla de la Juventud, and the storm brought in strong winds. There were no casualties, but caused an estimated $100 million dollars in damages.
- September 27, 2022 - Hurricane Ian made landfall in the Pinar del Rio Province as a strong Category 3 hurricane at 08:30 UTC. 5 people were killed and over 100,000 homes were damaged. Ian caused the entire power grid of Cuba to be knocked down the next day.
- August 28–29, 2023 - Hurricane Idalia brushed past extreme western Cuba as a strong tropical storm. Idalia brought some minor to moderate flooding to western Cuba as well as some sustained tropical storm force winds.
- August 2–3, 2024 - The precursor to Hurricane Debby would make numerous landfalls on Cuba as a tropical depression. Debby brought heavy rainfall across Western Cuba with rainfall peaking at 10.4 in (265 mm) in Bauta, Artemisa Province.
- October 20, 2024 - Hurricane Oscar made landfall near Baracoa in Guantánamo Province as a Category 1 hurricane, causing torrential rainfall and floods across the eastern part of the country, killing eight people.
- November 6, 2024 - Hurricane Rafael made landfall in Artemisa Province as a Category 3 hurricane with sustained winds of 115 mph (185 km/h). This made it the first major hurricane to hit the island since Hurricane Ian in 2022 and just 2 weeks after Hurricane Oscar.
- October 29, 2025 - Hurricane Melissa made landfall in Cuba near Santiago de Cuba as a Category 3 hurricane with sustained winds of 115 mph (185 km/h), damaging or destroying over 900,000 homes and killing one person.

== Climatology ==
Storms affecting Cuba by month
Month	Number of storms
May	1
June	5
July	1
August	18
September	13
October	21
November	7

Storms affecting Cuba by period
Period	Number of storms
1800s	1
1900–49	9
1950s	2
1960s	3
1980s	1
1990s	1
2000s	26
2010s	15
2020s	8

== Costliest storms ==
The following is a list of Atlantic tropical cyclones that caused the greatest economic losses in Cuba.

Costliest Cuban hurricanes
Rank	Hurricane	Season	Damage	Refs.
1	Irma	2017	$13.2 billion	
2	Ike	2008	$7.3 billion	
3	Matthew	2016	$2.58 billion	
4	Gustav	2008	$2.1 billion	
5	Michelle	2001	$2 billion	
5	Sandy	2012	$2 billion	
7	Dennis	2005	$1.5 billion	
8	Ivan	2004	$1.2 billion	
9	Rafael	2024	$1.08 billion	
10	Charley	2004	$923 million	

== Deadly storms ==
The following is a list of Atlantic tropical storms that caused fatalities in Cuba.

Name	Year	Number of deaths	Source
Santa Cruz del Sur	1932	3,033	
Flora	1963	1,750	
Fox	1952	600	
Unnamed	1933	70	
Unnamed	1935	35	
Alberto	1982	24	
Dennis	2005	16	
Alma	1966	12	
Sandy	2012	11	
Irma	2017	10	
Alberto	2018	10	
Oscar	2024	8	
Unnamed	1944	7	
King	1950	7	
Ike	2008	7	
Georges	1998	6	
Ian	2022	5	
Michelle	2001	5	
Unnamed	1935	4	
Charley	2004	4	
Matthew	2016	4	
Cleo	1964	1	
Noel	2007	1	
Lili	2002	1	

== See also ==
- List of Florida hurricanes
- List of Cayman Islands hurricanes
- List of Jamaica hurricanes
- Hurricanes in the Bahama Archipelago
- List of Hispaniola hurricanes
