= 1933 Cuba–Bahamas hurricane =

Category 3 Atlantic hurricane in 1933

Cuba–Bahamas hurricane
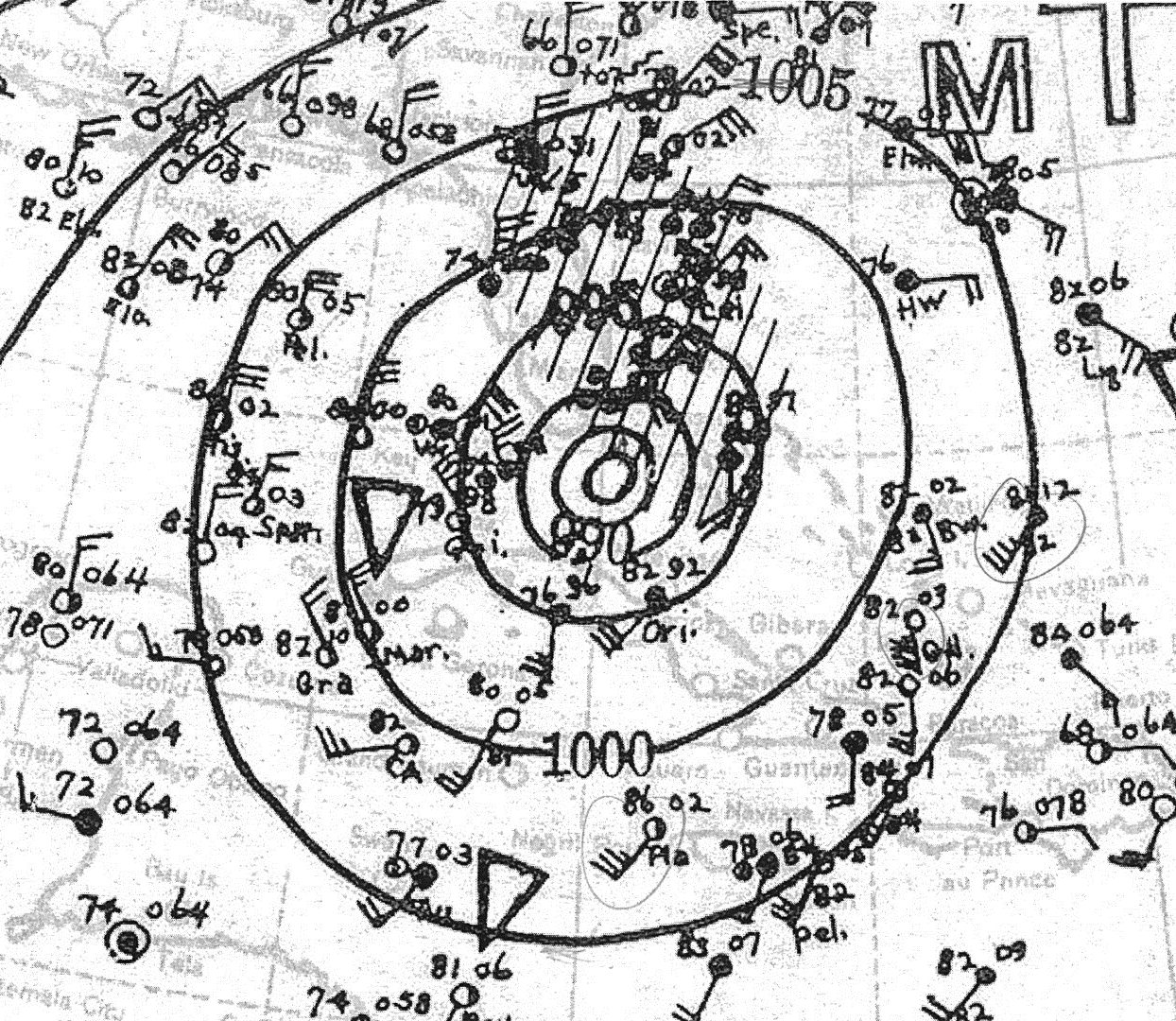
- Surface weather analysis of the hurricane near Florida on October 5

Meteorological history
- Formed: October 1, 1933
- Extratropical: October 8, 1933
- Dissipated: October 9, 1933

Category 3 major hurricane
- 1-minute sustained (SSHWS/NWS)
- Highest winds: 125 mph (205 km/h)
- Highest gusts: 150 mph (240 km/h)
- Lowest pressure: <958 mbar (hPa); <28.29 inHg

Overall effects
- Fatalities: 10 direct
- Damage: $1.1 million (1933 USD)
- Areas affected: Nicaragua, Honduras, Jamaica, Cuba, Florida, The Bahamas, Atlantic Canada
- IBTrACS
- Part of the 1933 Atlantic hurricane season

The 1933 Cuba–Bahamas hurricane was the last of six major hurricanes, or at least a Category 3 on the Saffir-Simpson hurricane wind scale, (Note: The Saffir-Simpson hurricane wind scale was developed in 1971, and has been retroactively applied to the entirety of the Atlantic hurricane database.) in the active 1933 Atlantic hurricane season. It formed on October 1 in the Caribbean Sea as the seventeenth tropical storm, and initially moved slowly to the north. While passing west of Jamaica, the storm damaged banana plantations and killed one person. On October 3, the storm became a hurricane, and the next day crossed western Cuba. Advance warning in the country prevented any storm-related fatalities, although four people suspected of looting were shot and killed during a curfew in Havana.

After entering the Florida Straits, the hurricane turned to the northeast, producing tropical storm winds along the Florida Keys. High rainfall caused flooding, while three tornadoes spawned by the storm damaged houses in the Miami area. The hurricane reached peak winds of 125 mph (205 km/h) on October 6 while east of the Bahamas. It subsequently weakened and became extratropical on October 8. The former hurricane lashed the coast of Nova Scotia with high winds and rain, leaving about $1 million (1933 CAD) in damage. Rough seas sank several ships and killed nine people in the region. The remnants of the hurricane eventually dissipated on October 9 to the south of Newfoundland.

== Meteorological history ==
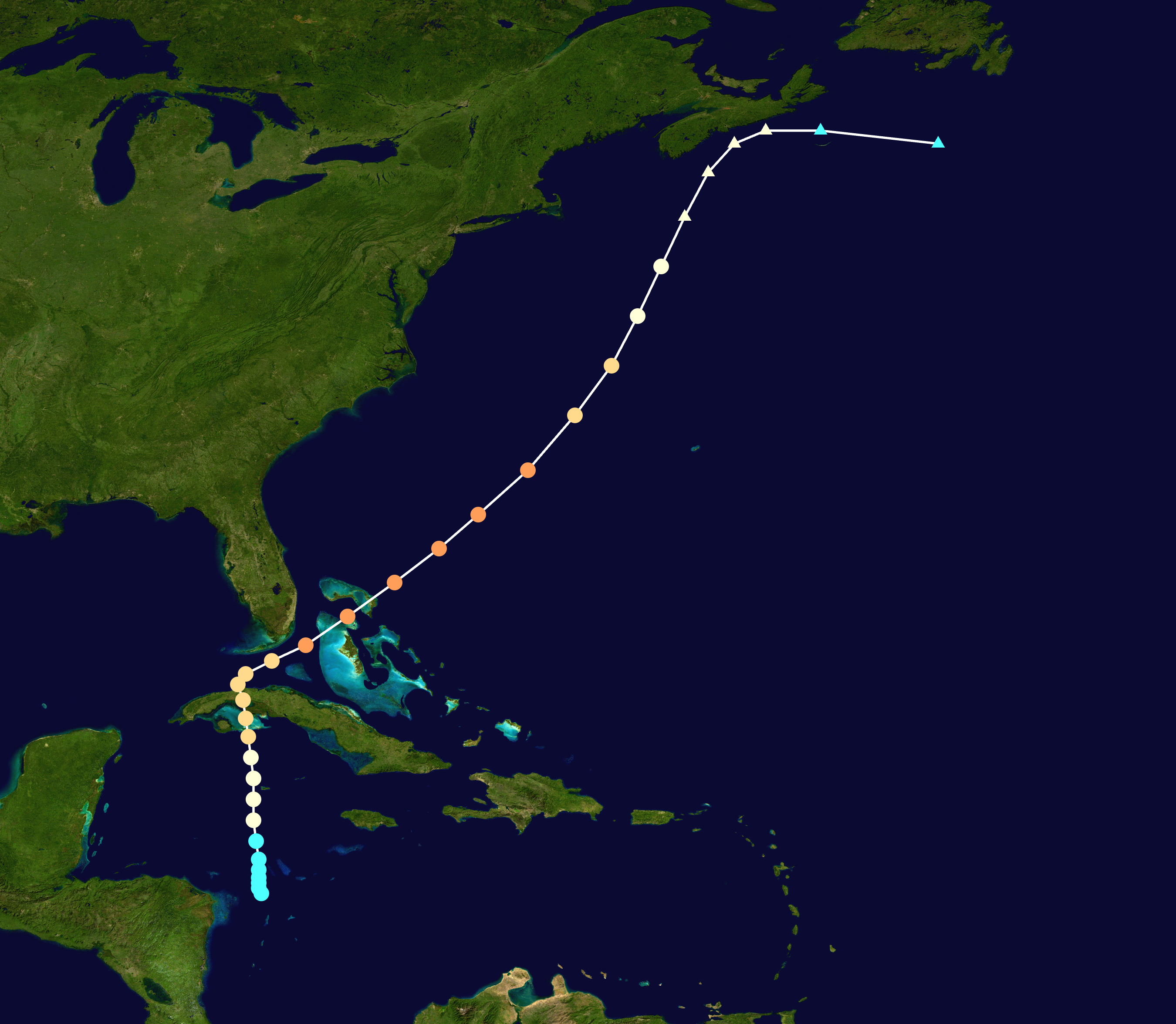
Map plotting the storm's track and intensity, according to the Saffir–Simpson scale Map key Saffir–Simpson scale Tropical depression (≤38 mph, ≤62 km/h) Tropical storm (39–73 mph, 63–118 km/h) Category 1 (74–95 mph, 119–153 km/h) Category 2 (96–110 mph, 154–177 km/h) Category 3 (111–129 mph, 178–208 km/h) Category 4 (130–156 mph, 209–251 km/h) Category 5 (≥157 mph, ≥252 km/h) Unknown Storm type Tropical cyclone Subtropical cyclone Extratropical cyclone, remnant low, tropical disturbance, or monsoon depression

Toward the end of September 1933, there was a large area of disturbed weather across the southern Caribbean Sea. By September 30, a low pressure area developed south of San Andrés island. The next day, observations from a station at Cabo Gracias a Dios and a ship indicated a tropical storm had developed off the eastern coast of Honduras. Low atmospheric pressure suggested the system had winds of tropical storm force despite lack of direct observations. Moving northward, the storm gained size as it slowly intensified. Based on observations and interpolation of data, it is estimated the storm became a hurricane early on October 3 while passing west of Jamaica. That day, a station at South Negril Point that day reported a force 8 on the Beaufort scale, well to the east of the center. While approaching the southern coast of Cuba, the hurricane reached estimated winds of 105 mph (165 km/h). At 09:00 UTC on October 4, the hurricane made landfall on the Zapata Peninsula of Cuba, followed by a second landfall on the Cuban mainland three hours later, after which it crossed the island as a Category 2 hurricane. Beginning at 16:00 UTC that day, the capital, Havana, observed the passage of the eye, where a pressure of 28.81 inHg (976 mbar) was reported.

Now very large in size, the hurricane weakened slightly over land before emerging into the Straits of Florida and re-intensifying. On October 5, it turned to the northeast while remaining southeast of the Florida mainland, although the strongest winds remained over water. At 12:00 UTC that day the storm reached winds of 115 mph (185 km/h)—major hurricane status—as a ship peripherally recorded 28.53 inHg (966 mb). Overnight the storm deepened further, crossing the northern Bahamas with winds of 120 mph (195 km/h). Early on October 6 while the hurricane was moving past the Bahamas, a ship reported a pressure of 28.30 inHg (958 mb) and hurricane-force winds, implying that the storm's central pressure was at most 940 mb (28 inHg), a value normally suggestive of 132-mile-per-hour (212 km/h) winds. Based on the ship and the storm's size, the maximum sustained winds were estimated at 125 mph (205 km/h), although another ship nearer to the Bahamas estimated winds of 150 mph (240 km/h). (Before reanalysis in 2012, the storm was classified as a strong Category 4 due to the latter's data.) The storm maintained peak winds for about 18 hours, after which it weakened while accelerating to the northeast. After passing to the west of Bermuda on October 7, the hurricane became extratropical the next day while still maintaining hurricane-force winds. The storm brushed the coast of Nova Scotia before it was last noted approaching another extratropical storm on October 9 to the south of Atlantic Canada.

== Preparations and impact ==
Early in its duration, the developing storm brushed the coast of Honduras with light winds. In Jamaica, gusts approached hurricane force, while heavy rainfall damaged transportation in Kingston. The storm wrecked small houses and damaged the local banana industry. There was one death in Jamaica. The storm prompted Cuban officials to declare a curfew for the capital in the midst of political upheaval following a coup. A newspaper described the curfew before the storm as "the most peaceful night in a week." However, the government ordered soldiers in Havana to shoot anyone suspected of looting, and four looters were killed during the storm's passage. Heavy associated rainfall caused rivers to overflow in three provinces, flooding low-lying areas. In Cienfuegos, the storm destroyed several houses. Offshore northern Cuba, two United States ships took shelter at the port in Matanzas due to rough seas. High tides flooded the Havana waterfront up to 3 ft (0.91 m) deep, and several boats sank at the city's harbor. Due to advance warning and evacuations, there were no direct deaths in the country, and 20 people were injured.

Storm warnings were issued on the west coast of Florida to Boca Grande and on the east coast to Titusville, with hurricane warnings for the Florida Keys. Although the hurricane passed just southeast of the Florida Keys, the highest winds reported in Florida were 44 mph (71 km/h) in Key West. The storm passed closest to Long Key, where winds were estimated at 63 mph (101 km/h), due to being on the weak side of the storm. Farther north, Miami reported winds of 35 mph (56 km/h). Rainfall reached over 11 in (280 mm) in 24 hours in Key West. There, the storm knocked over several trees and caused some power outages. Portions of the city were flooded while boats were washed ashore. Elsewhere in Florida, three tornadoes—a few retroactively rated F2 by tornado historian Thomas P. Grazulis—were reported during the hurricane's passage. In Fort Lauderdale, a tornado injured one person, and another one in Miami unroofed four homes and injured two. The third tornado was in Hollywood, where several houses were damaged; there a home and lumber company were unroofed as well.

Later as the hurricane moved through the Bahamas, it produced winds of 100 mph (160 km/h) at Hope Town and 91 mph (146 km/h) at Millville, both on Abaco. The storm caused minor structural damage on Green Turtle Cay but severe damage to farms there. At Nassau the storm downed trees and unroofed some homes. The outer periphery of the storm brushed Nantucket to the west with winds of 39 mph (63 km/h) and Bermuda to the east with 46 mph (74 km/h).

While moving offshore Atlantic Canada, the former hurricane produced gale-force winds, peaking at 52 mph (84 km/h) in Halifax, Nova Scotia. There, the storm also dropped heavy rainfall reaching 9.84 in (250 mm) over two days, including 3.6 in (91 mm) in 24 hours. Flooding covered streets in the province, causing traffic jams, and farmlands. In Annapolis Valley, the rainfall washed out a bridge while the winds damaged about one-third of the apple crop. The dam at Chocolate Lake overflowed due to the rainfall, and a dam broke in Great Village, destroying a nearby bridge. Many trees fell during the storm, resulting in power outages after some fell onto lines. Outside Nova Scotia, the storm produced winds of 51 mph (82 km/h) in Shediac, New Brunswick, where high waves left coastal damage. In Newfoundland, the storm washed out three bridges, as well as portions of roads and rails, and flooded one house. Throughout Atlantic Canada, high waves washed ashore, sank, or broke at least ten boats from their moorings, killing nine people including seven from an overturned boat sailing from Boston to Yarmouth. Overall damage in Canada was estimated at $1 million (1933 CAD), including $250,000 in lost apple crop. (Note: $1 million in 1933 Canadian dollars (CAD) would be $20.5 million in 2013 CAD, adjusted for inflation figures from the Bank of Canada. When converted to USD, the total would be $20.1 million as provided by the Oanda Corporation, which would be about $1.1 million when adjusted for inflation to 1933.)

The German travel writer Richard Katz witnessed the hurricane while in Havana, and described the experience in his book "Loafing Around the Globe" ("Ein Bummel um Die Welt").

== See also ==
- List of Florida hurricanes (1900–49)
