= 1935 Cuba hurricane =

Category 4 Atlantic hurricane in 1935

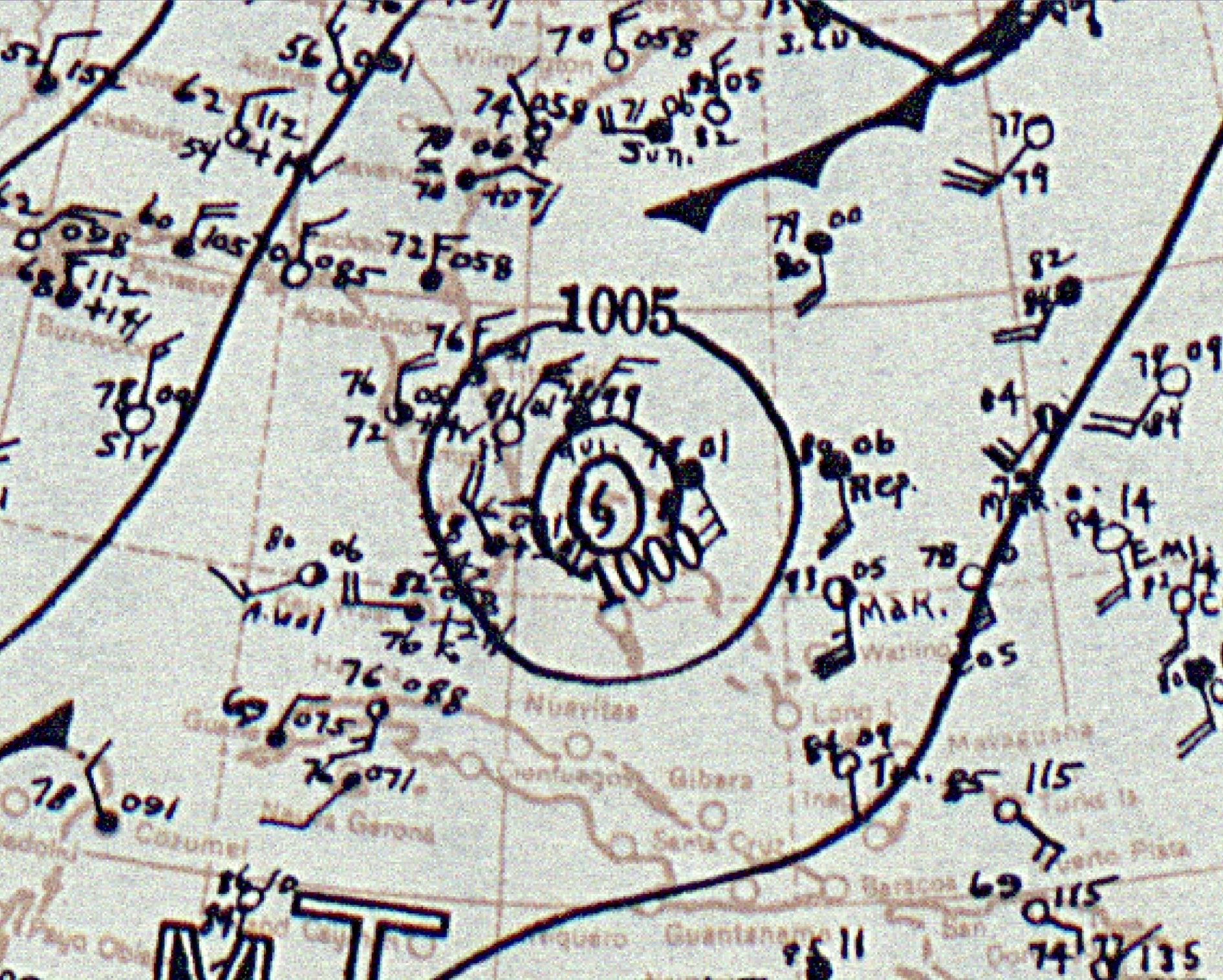
- Surface weather analysis of the storm at peak intensity on September 29 off the eastern coast of Florida

Meteorological history
- Formed: September 23, 1935
- Dissipated: October 2, 1935

Category 4 major hurricane
- 1-minute sustained (SSHWS/NWS)
- Highest winds: 140 mph (220 km/h)
- Lowest pressure: ≤945 mbar (hPa); ≤27.91 inHg

Overall effects
- Fatalities: 52
- Damage: $14.5 million (1935 USD)
- Areas affected: Jamaica, Cayman Islands, Cuba, The Bahamas, Florida, Bermuda, Canadian Maritimes
- IBTrACS
- Part of the 1935 Atlantic hurricane season

The 1935 Cuba hurricane was an intense and deadly tropical cyclone which caused devastation across many areas of the western Atlantic, particularly Cuba and The Bahamas, in September and October 1935. The fifth tropical storm and third hurricane of the 1935 Atlantic hurricane season, the storm formed from a tropical depression in the central Caribbean Sea on September 23. The disturbance gradually organized as it moved to the west, and strengthened to tropical storm intensity less than a day after formation and further to a hurricane by September 25. Subsequently, the hurricane curved northward from its initial westward motion. On September 27, the storm reached major hurricane intensity before making landfall near Cienfuegos, Cuba as a modern-day Category 3 hurricane the next day. (Note: A major hurricane is a storm that ranks as Category 3 or higher on the Saffir–Simpson hurricane scale.) After passing the island, the hurricane reintensified, and reached a peak intensity with a minimum barometric pressure of at least 945 mbar (hPa; 27.91 inHg) and maximum sustained winds of 140 mph (220 km/h), making it a modern-day Category 4 hurricane. At the same time, the tropical cyclone passed over the Bahamian island of Bimini before moving out to sea. As it progressed northeastward, the hurricane gradually weakened before transitioning into an extratropical storm by October 2. The extratropical remnants made landfall on Newfoundland shortly after before dissipating late that day.

The hurricane caused widespread destruction in areas of the western Atlantic. In Jamaica, the storm's strong winds and heavy rain destroyed roughly 3 percent of the island's banana production and damaged road networks. Damage on the island country totaled to $2.7 million. (Note: All damage totals are in 1935 United States dollars unless otherwise noted.) In Cayman Brac, strong winds damaged infrastructure and crops, though no fatalities resulted. Most of the cyclone's deaths occurred in Cuba, where the storm made its first landfall. The hurricane's effects caused a 100 mi (160 km) wide swath of damage which cut across the country. Strong storm surge destroyed low-lying coastal towns, particularly in Cienfuegos, where numerous homes were destroyed and 17 people died. Across Cuba, the storm caused $12 million in damages and 35 deaths. As it crossed the island, widespread evacuation procedures occurred in southern areas of Florida, heightened due to the effects of a disastrous hurricane which struck less than a month prior. However, damage there was only of moderate severity. Passing directly over Bimini in The Bahamas, the hurricane destroyed nearly half of the island with its large storm surge. There, 14 people were killed. Further north, the storm caused slight impacts in Bermuda and Atlantic Canada, though a person drowned off of Halifax, Nova Scotia due to rough seas. Overall, the tropical cyclone caused 52 deaths and $14.7 million in damages, making it the third-costliest hurricane of the hurricane season.

== Meteorological history ==
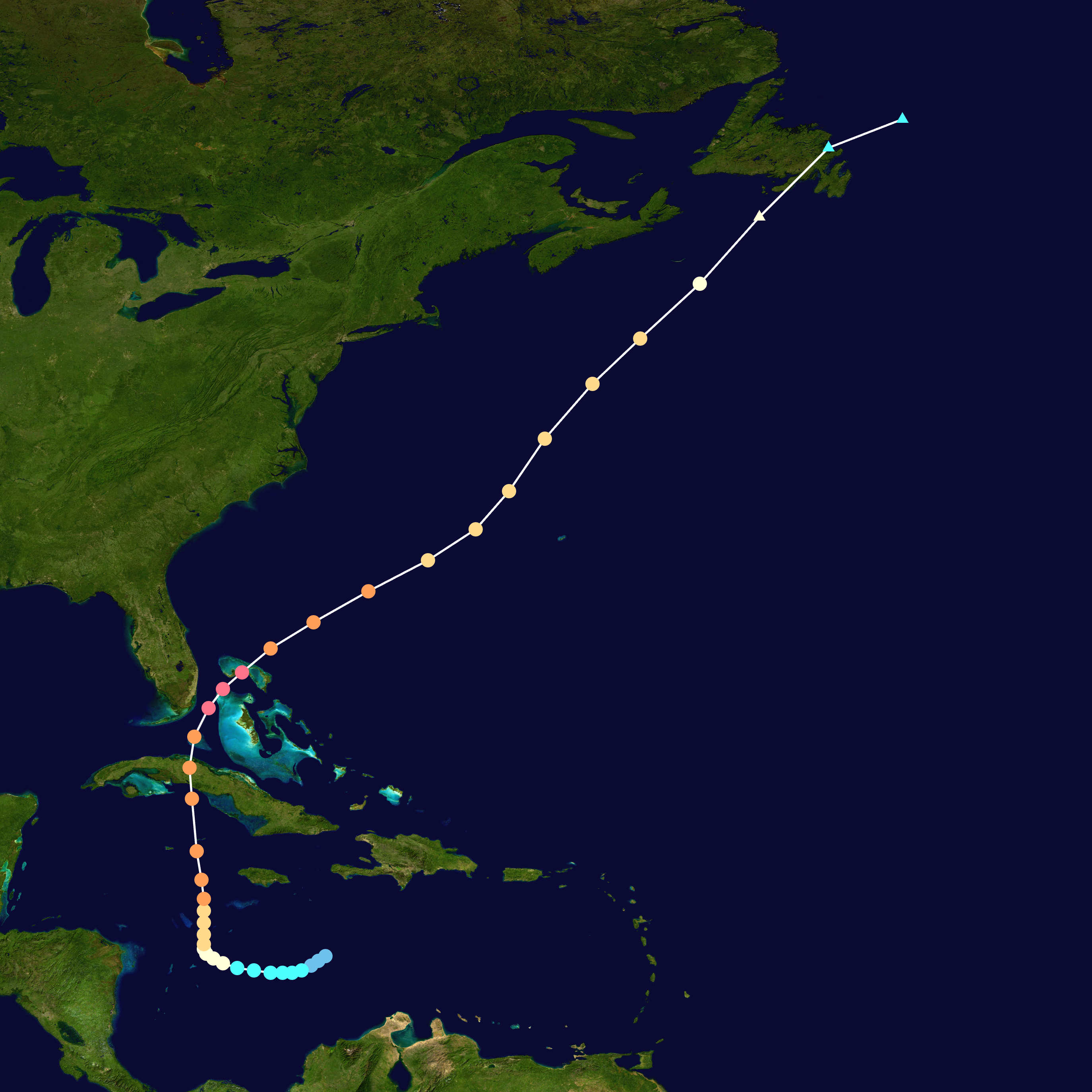
Map plotting the storm's track and intensity, according to the Saffir–Simpson scale Map key Saffir–Simpson scale Tropical depression (≤38 mph, ≤62 km/h) Tropical storm (39–73 mph, 63–118 km/h) Category 1 (74–95 mph, 119–153 km/h) Category 2 (96–110 mph, 154–177 km/h) Category 3 (111–129 mph, 178–208 km/h) Category 4 (130–156 mph, 209–251 km/h) Category 5 (≥157 mph, ≥252 km/h) Unknown Storm type Tropical cyclone Subtropical cyclone Extratropical cyclone, remnant low, tropical disturbance, or monsoon depression

Though the storm's origins prior to tropical cyclogenesis remain unclear, it was analyzed that a tropical depression developed just northwest of Punta Gallinas at 0600 UTC on September 23. At the time, the disturbance had an outermost closed isobar of at least 1010 mbar (hPa; 29.83 inHg). Evidence for a tropical cyclone in the region was confirmed by the ship S.S. San Gill, which observed strong winds along with rough seas generated by the nearby disturbance. Drifting towards the southwest, the depression acquired tropical storm strength by 0000 UTC the following day. At the time, however, the cyclone lacked defined characteristics and maintained a weak center of circulation. By 1200 UTC on September 25, the storm was estimated to have reached hurricane intensity. Shortly after, the storm curved northward along the 80°W longitudinal line.

At 0300 UTC on September 26, the tanker A.C. Bedford encountered the strengthening hurricane, and reported winds of hurricane-force winds and a barometric pressure of 986 mbar (hPa; 29.13 inHg); this was the lowest pressure associated with the hurricane measured in the Caribbean Sea, as well as the only confirmed report of hurricane-force winds in connection with the storm there. Similarly low barometric pressures and strong winds were reported by various other vessels in the vicinity of the hurricane. At 1200 UTC, the storm was upgraded to Category 2 intensity. On September 27, the tropical cyclone moved through a region lacking in ships. As a result, the hurricane was not well-documented during this period, though it was estimated that the storm attained Category 3 hurricane intensity–a major hurricane–at 1200 UTC that day. At the same time, the cyclone also curved slightly westward, which brought it away from Jamaica. The hurricane continued northward, and made landfall near Cienfuegos, Cuba, at 0800 UTC on September 28. At the time, the tropical cyclone had maximum sustained winds of 120 mph (195 km/h), making it a modern-day Category 3 hurricane. The lowest pressure measured upon landfall was 955 mbar (hPa; 28.20 inHg) at the Montserrat Observatory in Cienfuegos. This peripheral measurement was analyzed to have also been the hurricane's minimum central pressure upon landfall. Although lower pressures were measured after the hurricane's Cuban landfall, the measurement in Cienfuegos was the only one included in the storm's HURDAT listing. (Note: HURDAT is an official database listing the locations and intensities of Atlantic hurricanes since 1851.) Over land, the hurricane began to trek northeastward, a pattern which would persist throughout the storm's existence.

The tropical cyclone passed over Cuba without much change in intensity and reentered the Atlantic Ocean later on September 28, while still a major hurricane. Passing over warm ocean waters, the storm reintensified, and attained Category 4 hurricane intensity at 0000 UTC on September 29. The storm's northeastward motion brought it directly over the Bahamian island of Bimini at roughly 0600 UTC that day. A weather station on the island recorded a minimum barometric pressure of 945 mbar (hPa; 27.91 inHg), though this measurement was taken nearly an hour before the center of the hurricane passed. At the time, the storm's maximum winds were estimated at 140 mbar (220 km/h), the highest analyzed in connection with the system. By late on September 29, the hurricane had moved through The Bahamas and had begun to weaken as it accelerated towards the northeast. By 1200 UTC the next day, the storm had weakened down to Category 2 intensity, below major hurricane strength. Shortly after, it made its closest approach to Bermuda, but subsequently recurved to a more northerly bearing. At 0000 UTC on October 2, the storm degenerated into a Category 1 hurricane. The storm subsequently transitioned into an extratropical cyclone at 0600 UTC, though it still maintained hurricane-force winds. The extratropical remnants made a final landfall on the southern coast of Newfoundland during the dawn hours of October 2 with winds of 70 mph (110 km/h). After quickly passing over the island, the cyclone dissipated by 1800 UTC that day east of Newfoundland, by which time it had been absorbed by another extratropical system.

== Preparations, impact, and aftermath ==
Deaths and damage by region
Region	Total deaths	Damage (USD)	Source(s)
Bermuda	0	Minimal	
Canada	1	–	
Cayman Islands	0	–	
Cuba	35	$12 million	
Florida	0	–	
Jamaica	2	$2.7 million	
The Bahamas	14		
Totals:	52	$14.7 million	
Because of differing sources, totals may not match.

=== Jamaica and the Cayman Islands ===
Upon the storm's tropical cyclogenesis, the United States Weather Bureau (USWB) advised ships in the Western Caribbean Sea of the impending storm, though no particular warnings were issued by the USWB afterwards. Passing west of Jamaica on September 26–27, the hurricane produced torrential rainfall and strong winds over the island. The lowest barometric pressure measured in Jamaica was 1006 mbar (hPa; 29.72 inHg) in both Kingston and Negril. The excessive precipitation was due in part to a second tropical disturbance which originated from Lesser Antilles and had also brought rainfall to parts of the Greater Antilles. Gales as strong as 50 mph (80 km/h) caused extensive damage on the island. Jamaica's banana crop was severely damaged, with 2 million banana trees estimated to have been uprooted, representing 3% of the island's total banana crop. Damage to the banana crop was estimated at $2.5 million. Heavy rainfall washed out roads and bridges, amounting to $200,000 in damages. Two people were killed in Jamaica. In Cayman Brac, the largest of the Cayman Islands, strong winds caused severe infrastructural and crop damage, though loss of life was mitigated due to radioed warnings.

=== Cuba ===
As the hurricane approached Cuba, windows were boarded up and trees were anchored in Havana, Cuba. People were evacuated from Santa Cruz del Sur. Rail service was redirected to the town in order to assist in the evacuation process, which resulted in the evacuation of 1,500 people by train. Shipping across the Cuban coast was halted and kept in ports and harbors. Other evacuation procedures underwent in southern Cuban cities during the evening hours of September 27.

Strong waves caused the British steamship Wandered to run aground at Point Del Birril on the southern coast of Cuba. As a result, the ship radioed a distress call, which was later intercepted by United States Coast Guard personnel in Fort Lauderdale, Florida. Inland, the hurricane caused severe damage, particularly in Central Cuba, where a 100 mi (160 km) swath of damage occurred. In Cienfuegos, Cienfuegos Province, where the storm made landfall, a thousand homes were estimated to have been destroyed. In the town alone, 17 people were killed. Telecommunication lines were downed by the strong winds, causing radio lines to be silent. As a result, relief efforts were slowed. In Trinidad, Sancti Spíritus, buildings were swept away by strong storm surge. By contrast, in Santiago de Cuba, Santiago de Cuba, only minor damage occurred. In Havana, minor damage also occurred, though disruptions to the country's electrical grid isolated communications relayed from the capital.

After the hurricane passed, relief efforts began in the Cuban provinces of Matanzas, Santa Clara, and Camagüey, where the storm hit. The gunboat Viente de Mayo paralleled the coast of damaged areas, evaluating the damage left by the hurricane. The Cuban Red Cross sent physicians and nurses to Santa Clara Province. Refugees were sent to Havana. The coastal town of Tunas de Zaza, Trinidad was evacuated to make room for refugees.

=== Florida ===
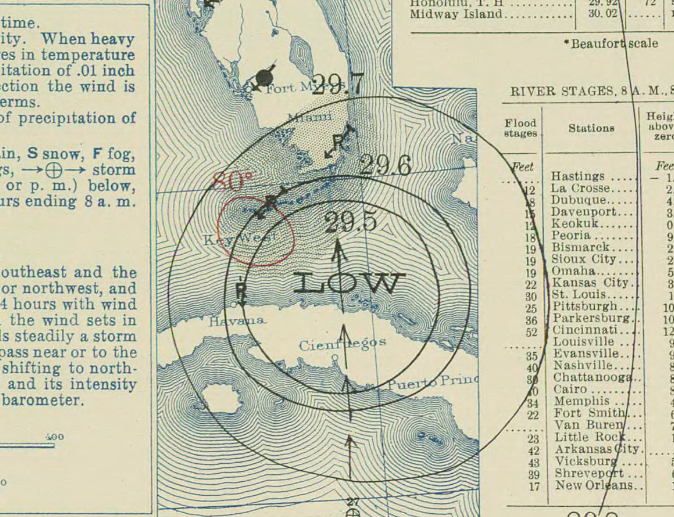
Surface weather analysis of the storm in the Florida Straits on September 28

After crossing the Cuban island, hurricane warnings posted for Key West to Palm Beach on September 28, though the center of the hurricane was not predicted to make landfall. These warnings were later extended northward to include Melbourne. Storm warnings were also issued for areas of Florida's west coast from Everglades City to Tarpon Springs, and areas of Florida's east coast from Daytona Beach to Charleston, South Carolina. Parts of the Florida Keys and other nearby low-lying areas were evacuated with assistance from the Federal Emergency Relief Administration (FERA). The same region had been impacted by a Category 5 hurricane less than a month prior. As a result, relief workers cleaning up the resultant debris were also forced to evacuate. Those evacuated were sent to Miami. Electricity was turned off in the Florida Keys as a precautionary measure. In Homestead, residents were advised to take shelter in a local school auditorium. The American Red Cross dispatched emergency equipment to the region, along with several other local relief agencies. Air traffic over southeastern Florida was suspended due to the proximity of the passing hurricane. Pan American World Airways cancelled all flights to and from Key West. Eastern Air Lines maintained north-bound air traffic but did not have any control over flights coming from the south. Several ocean liners were delayed until the hurricane passed.

=== Elsewhere ===
Prior to the storm's closest approach, storm warnings were posted for the entirety of Bermuda. Building windows were boarded up and shipping services were postponed. The liner Monarch of Bermuda was forced to unload 400 passengers at St. George, Bermuda rather than in Hamilton as a result. The hurricane made its closest approach to Bermuda on September 29, though its center remained roughly 100 mi (160 km/h) northeast of the island. However, no damage of considerable extent was reported.

As the hurricane's extratropical remnants proceeded into Atlantic Canada, the storm produced rough seas and strong winds. The yacht Cumargo evacuated to the Halifax, Nova Scotia harbor to avoid rising waters. Off of Halifax, however, a man drowned after his ship capsized; this would be the only fatality recorded in Canada associated with the storm. In Newfoundland, where the extratropical storm made landfall, additional ships were damaged. In St. Mary's, four vessels were heavily damaged. The Portuguese schooner Rosita signaled a distress call off of Cape Race, but was later recovered. Similarly, the ship Madeline Hebb encountered the storm, but made it back to St. Anthony with no damage. Further inland, gusts peaked at 36 mph (58 km/h) at Cape Race. Heavy precipitation also resulted, though no damage was reported.

== See also ==
- List of Florida hurricanes (1900–49)
- 1932 Cuba hurricane
- Hurricane Seventeen (1933)
