= List of Texas hurricanes (pre-1900) =

The list of Texas hurricanes prior to 1900 extends back to 1527 and encompasses all known North Atlantic hurricanes to have affected Texas before 1900.

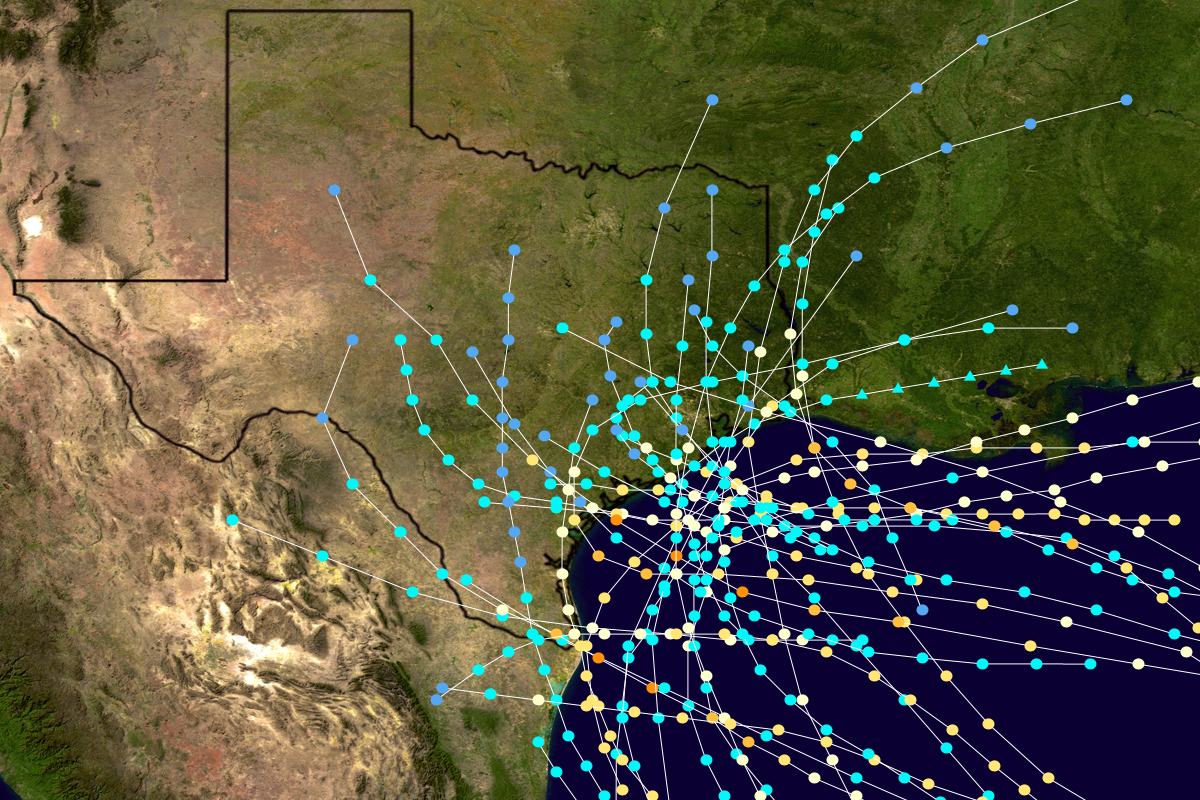
A map of all recorded hurricanes to have affected Texas during 1851–1899

== Pre-1800 ==
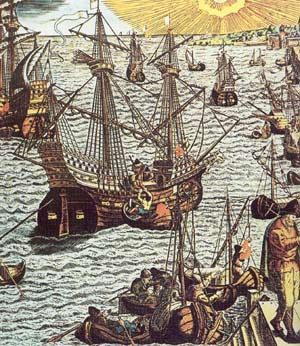
Portuguese ships, then part of the Spanish treasure fleets, being loaded with riches. Contemporary print by Theodor de Bry

- November 1527 – One of only two known tropical cyclones to have made landfall in Texas in November destroys a merchant fleet on Galveston Island, killing at least 162 people and possibly up to 200.
- 1553 – During an unspecified period, a hurricane capsizes three vessels of a Spanish treasure fleet and displacing or wrecking thirteen others.
- 1554 – Another Spanish treasure fleet is affected by a hurricane, with three ships lost during the storm near South Padre Island.
- November 1590 – Thousands aboard ships are killed by a hurricane in the Gulf of Mexico; it is unknown if the storm affected Texas, though meteorologist David Roth included the storm in his publication on Texas Hurricane History.
- September 12, 1600 – An offshore hurricane causes 60 fatalities.
- August 30, 1615 – A storm capsizes a ship offshore, killing all passengers aboard.
- October 21, 1631 – More than 300 lives are lost during a hurricane that moves through the Gulf of Mexico; it is unknown if the storm affected Texas, though meteorologist David Roth included the storm in his publication on Texas Hurricane History.
- September 4, 1766 – Five treasure ships are washed ashore during a hurricane that strikes Galveston. The storm produces a storm surge of around 7 feet (2.1 m), which causes flooding near the coastline. A mission on the lower Trinity River is destroyed.
- 1791 – A hurricane floods South Padre Island and surrounding areas as it moves along the southern Texas coastline. About 50,000 cattle are killed due to the flooding.

== 1800–1849 ==
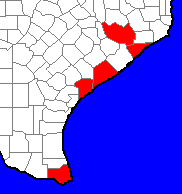
Map of counties in Texas severely affected by 1837 Racer's Storm

- September 12, 1818 – A hurricane floods Galveston Island up to 4 feet (1.2 m) deep, and also severely damages all but six buildings on the island. All ships near the island are seriously damaged or destroyed. The hurricane is the first known storm to affect the region in 21 years; the majority of the Texas coastline is uninhabited, until 1817 when privateer Jean Lafitte settles near Galveston for about five years.
- September 10, 1829 – The southern coastline of Texas experiences heavy damage and flooding when a hurricane strikes near the mouth of the Rio Grande. This is the first tropical cyclone to affect the state in 11 years; throughout much of the 1820s, the region near the coastline becomes more populated, though most settlements are inland. None of the locations report a destructive storm during the time period.
- August 18, 1831 – A hurricane hits near the mouth of the Rio Grande, causing further damage to areas affected by the storm two years prior.
- September, 1834 – Another tropical cyclone affects the region near the mouth of the Rio Grande.
- August 18, 1835 – Considered among the severest storms on record in the region, a hurricane moves ashore in extreme southern Texas, which washes all ships ashore along Brazos Island. A ship in Matagorda Bay capsized during the storm, causing 14 deaths.
- October 1837 – The Racer's Storm becomes the first hurricane on record to affect the entire Texas coastline. It first strikes near Brownsville on October 1, where it destroys most of the ships on Brazos Island. Turning northeastward into the Gulf of Mexico, the hurricane approaches Galveston on October 6, bringing a storm tide of at least 6 ft (1.8 m) which floods all of Galveston Island. The storm destroys most of the buildings in Galveston, and across the coast, ships are washed ashore up to 3 miles (5 km) inland. It continues northeastward and leaves the state near Sabine Pass, after causing at least two deaths in the state.
- 1838 – A tropical cyclone is accompanied with high tides as it moves ashore near the mouth of the Rio Grande.
- November 5, 1839 – A hurricane makes landfall near Galveston, becoming one of only two hurricanes in November to hit the state.
- 1840 – A tropical cyclone produces flooding and destroys buildings near the mouth of the Rio Grande.
- September 8, 1842 – After moving across the Gulf of Mexico, a storm known as Antje's Hurricane moves ashore near the mouth of the Rio Grande and brings heavy rainfall along its path.
- September 17, 1842 – A strong tropical storm hits near Galveston, which wrecks several buildings and houses from storm surge flooding. The storm kills 40 cattle when a house blows down. Damage is estimated at $10,000 (1842 USD, $220,000 2008 USD).
- October 5, 1842 – Galveston is struck by another hurricane, with several buildings damaged or destroyed. The storm floods most of the island, though no lives are lost.
- August 6, 1844 – Moving ashore in the extreme southern portion of the state, a hurricane causes heavy damage, destroying most of the buildings near the coastline. On Brazos Island, the storm kills 70 people.
- October 17, 1848 – Another hurricane makes landfall near the mouth of the Rio Grande, which floods Brazos Island and causes above normal tides.
- September 13, 1849 – Southern Texas is struck by a hurricane, with some ships damaged by the storm.

== 1850–1859 ==
The first storm of the 1851 Atlantic hurricane season made landfall near Corpus Christi.

The first storm of the 1854 Atlantic hurricane season made landfall in Texas, while the fourth storm of the season, another hurricane, moved inland near Galveston, Texas, causing 2 deaths from nearly 6 inches of rainfall, as well as $20,000 in damage.

The fourth storm of the 1857 Atlantic hurricane season made landfall near Brownsville.

== 1860–1869 ==
The final storm of the 1863 hurricane season paralleled the Texas coastline. The second storm of 1865 hurricane season made landfall in Texas near Brownsville the day it formed.

The fourth storm of 1865 hurricane season made landfall in the Texas/Louisiana border. The first hurricane of the 1866 hurricane season made landfall in Texas on July 15.

The seventh storm of 1867 hurricane season paralleled the Texas coastline. The second storm of 1869 hurricane season was a Category 2 hurricane moved across the Gulf of Mexico, hitting the lower Texas coast on August 17. Most of the damage that occurred came from storm surge.

== 1870–1879 ==
Two June tropical storms in the 1871 Atlantic hurricane season began the hurricane season by hitting Texas on June 2 and June 9. The two caused light damage and one death. From September 30-October 2, 1871, The third hurricane to affect Texas of the 1871 Atlantic hurricane season moved just offshore the length of the coast. A ship named the S.S.. Hall sunk during the storm; all hands were lost. On Mustang Island, it was the severest gale in 16 years. Tides at Indianola were the highest since 1844; most of the town flooded. The jail at Lavaca was washed away. Many people died in the tempest.

The first and fourth storms of the 1874 Atlantic hurricane season made landfall in Texas. On September 5, 1874, the barometer dropped to 29:51 at 6:30 pm in Corpus Christi. The city suffered flooding and heavy wind damage. Numerous ships in the harbor were damaged. At least one death was reported from drowning.

The third storm of 1875 Atlantic hurricane season hit Indianola, Texas at that intensity on the September 16. It turned northeastward, dissipating over Mississippi. The storm brought strong storm surge to the Texas coast, causing heavy damage and a total of 800 deaths. The storm was the first of two hurricanes to devastate Indianola, the other being the Indianola Hurricane of 1886.

The second storm of the 1877 Atlantic hurricane season. From September 15–17, 1877: Hurricane affected the entire Texas coast. In Galveston, winds were noted out of the east during the night of September 15. By September 17, tides had increased to 5.2 feet above mean low water. Winds increased to 60 mph at that time. High tides, though, were the main villain. A "fresh gale" at Mustang Island destroyed their wharf.

The third storm of the 1879 Atlantic hurricane season hit the northeast Texas coast on August 23. Damage was heavy, but there were no reported deaths.

== 1880–1889 ==
The second storm of the 1880 Atlantic hurricane season made landfall near Brownsville, Texas on the 13th, and dissipated rapidly over land on the 14th. It caused 30 deaths near the Yucatán Peninsula, and 5 deaths in Texas.

The second storm of the 1881 Atlantic hurricane season was a tropical storm hit Corpus Christi, Texas in the middle of August, but caused no reported deaths. Signals were blown down at the harbor, and one boat was lost.

The third storm of the 1882 Atlantic hurricane season was a Category 2 hurricane was first observed in the Gulf of Mexico on September 14. Its prior track is unknown, but it moved to the west-northwest, and hit near the Texas/Louisiana border on September 15. The storm brought a 3-foot storm surge, caused moderate damage, and killed one person.

The first hurricane of the 1886 Atlantic hurricane season made landfall near the Texas/Louisiana border.

August 20, 1886: the Indianola Hurricane made landfall as a Category 4 hurricane. It destroyed the town of Indianola, then the largest and most economically important port city in the state of Texas. With an estimated central pressure of 925 mb, this hurricane is on record as the most intense ever to strike the state of Texas. The hurricane also caused at least 25 deaths.

The 8th storm of the 1886 Atlantic hurricane season took a west track through Cuba and the Gulf of Mexico. It turned northward in the western gulf, and hit near Brownsville, Texas as a 100 mph hurricane on September 23.

The 10th storm of the 1886 Atlantic hurricane season made landfall near the border between Louisiana and Texas. It caused 175-200 deaths due to the heavy rainfall and storm surge, with $250,000 in damage occurring.

The ninth storm of the 1887 Atlantic hurricane season made landfall near Brownsville.

The first two storms of the 1888 Atlantic hurricane season made landfall in the same area of Texas.

== 1890–1899 ==
The first storm of 1891 Atlantic hurricane season made landfall near Galveston, Texas. The second storm of the 1895 Atlantic hurricane season made landfall in the southernmost part of Texas.

The second storm of 1897 Atlantic hurricane season had effects on parts of Texas.

The sixth storm of 1898 Atlantic hurricane season made landfall near the Texas/Louisiana border.

The first storm of 1899 Atlantic hurricane season made landfall in Texas.

== Deadly storms ==
The following is a list of hurricanes with known deaths in the state. Several other hurricanes killed an unknown number of people in Texas, and multiple others left several missing.

Year	Number of deaths
1527	162
1844	70
1600	60
1835	14
1837	2

== See also ==
- List of Texas hurricanes
