= 1875 Indianola hurricane =

Category 3 Atlantic hurricane in 1875

Hurricane Three 1875 Indianola hurricane
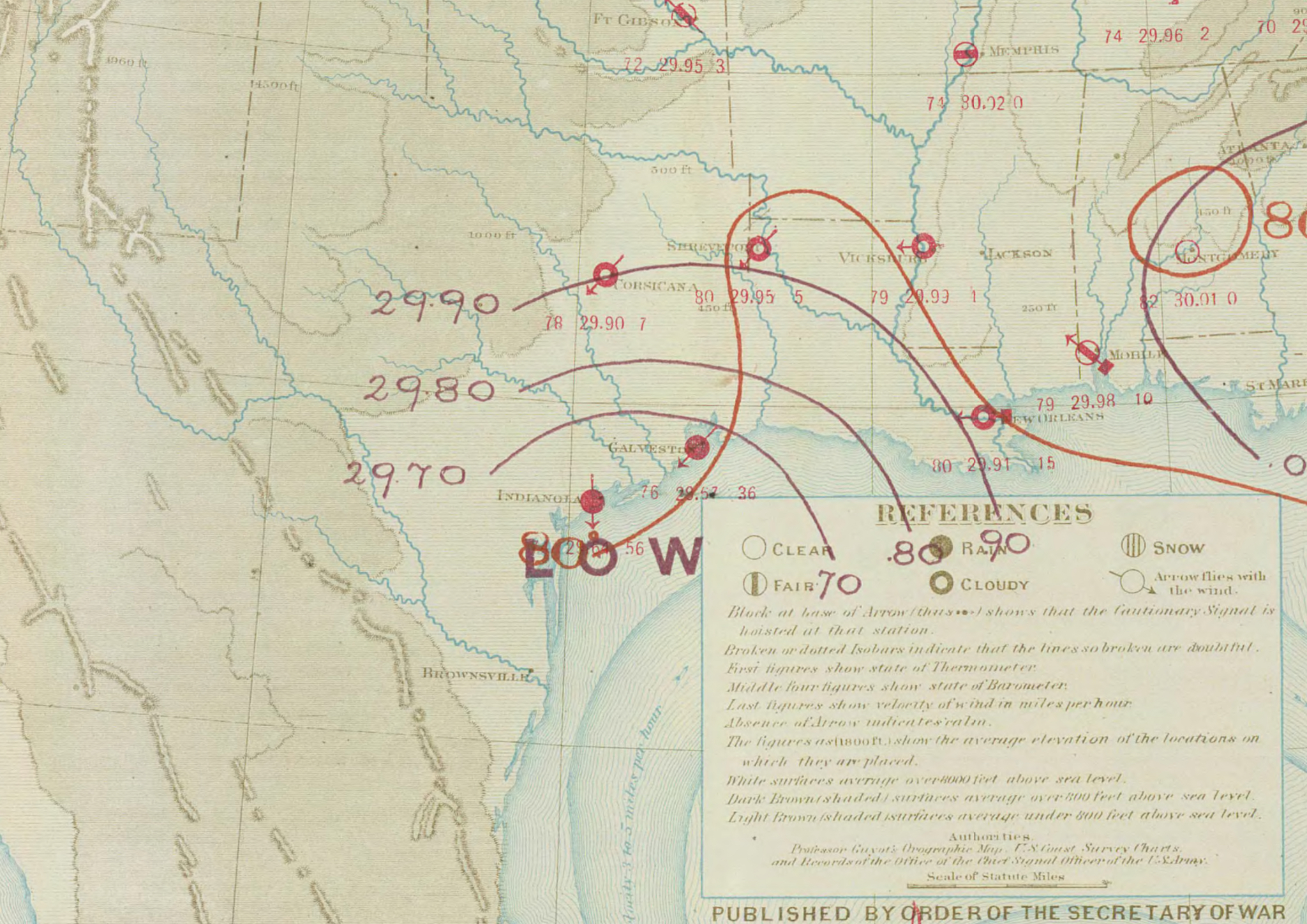
- Surface weather map of the hurricane on September 16, nearing landfall in Texas at peak intensity

Meteorological history
- Formed: September 8, 1875
- Dissipated: September 18, 1875

Category 3 major hurricane
- 1-minute sustained (SSHWS/NWS)
- Highest winds: 115 mph (185 km/h)
- Lowest pressure: 955 mbar (hPa); 28.20 inHg

Overall effects
- Fatalities: 800
- Damage: More than $4 million (1875 USD)
- Areas affected: Lesser Antilles, Greater Antilles (Cuba landfall), Florida, Louisiana, Texas (landfall)
- Part of the 1875 Atlantic hurricane season

The 1875 Indianola hurricane brought a devastating and deadly storm surge to the coast of Texas. The third known system of the 1875 Atlantic hurricane season, the storm was first considered a tropical cyclone while located east of the Lesser Antilles on September 8. After passing through the Windward Islands and entering the Caribbean Sea, the cyclone gradually began to move more northwestward and brushed the Tiburon Peninsula of Haiti late on September 12. On the following day, the storm made a few landfalls on the southern coast of Cuba before moving inland over Sancti Spíritus Province. The system emerged into the Gulf of Mexico near Havana and briefly weakened to a tropical storm. Thereafter, the storm slowly re-intensified and gradually turned westward. On September 16, the hurricane peaked as a Category 3 hurricane with winds of 115 mph (185 km/h). Later that day, the hurricane made landfall near Indianola, Texas. The storm quickly weakened and turned northeastward, before dissipating over Mississippi on September 18.

The hurricane brought heavy rainfall to several islands of the Lesser Antilles, especially on Barbados and Saint Vincent. The latter reported significant damage and loss of life, including a ship sunk with the loss of 20 crew. Flooding and landslides caused severe damage to crops and roads, while two bridges and several homes were swept away, including more than 30 homes in total from the towns of Hopewell and Mesopotamia. Another 20 people died after the ship Codfish sank offshore Martinique. Navassa Island experienced strong winds, heavy rainfall, and very large waves, downing many trees and destroying several homes. Strong winds and above normal tides in Cuba left damage across the island, especially in Júcaro (close to Venezuela, Cuba) and Santa Cruz del Sur. In Texas, the storm completely destroyed Velasco and nearly destroyed the town of Indianola. In the latter, storm surge washed away three-quarters of the buildings and significantly damaged the structures that remained standing. Only eight buildings in the town were undamaged. Four people drowned after the two lighthouses at Pass Cavallo were swept away. At Galveston, several houses and a railroad bridge were destroyed, and a ship, the Beardstown, sank in Galveston Bay. The town suffered about $4 million (equivalent to $117 million in 2025) in damage and 30 deaths. Overall, the hurricane caused approximately 800 deaths, with at least 300 in Indianola alone.

== Meteorological history ==
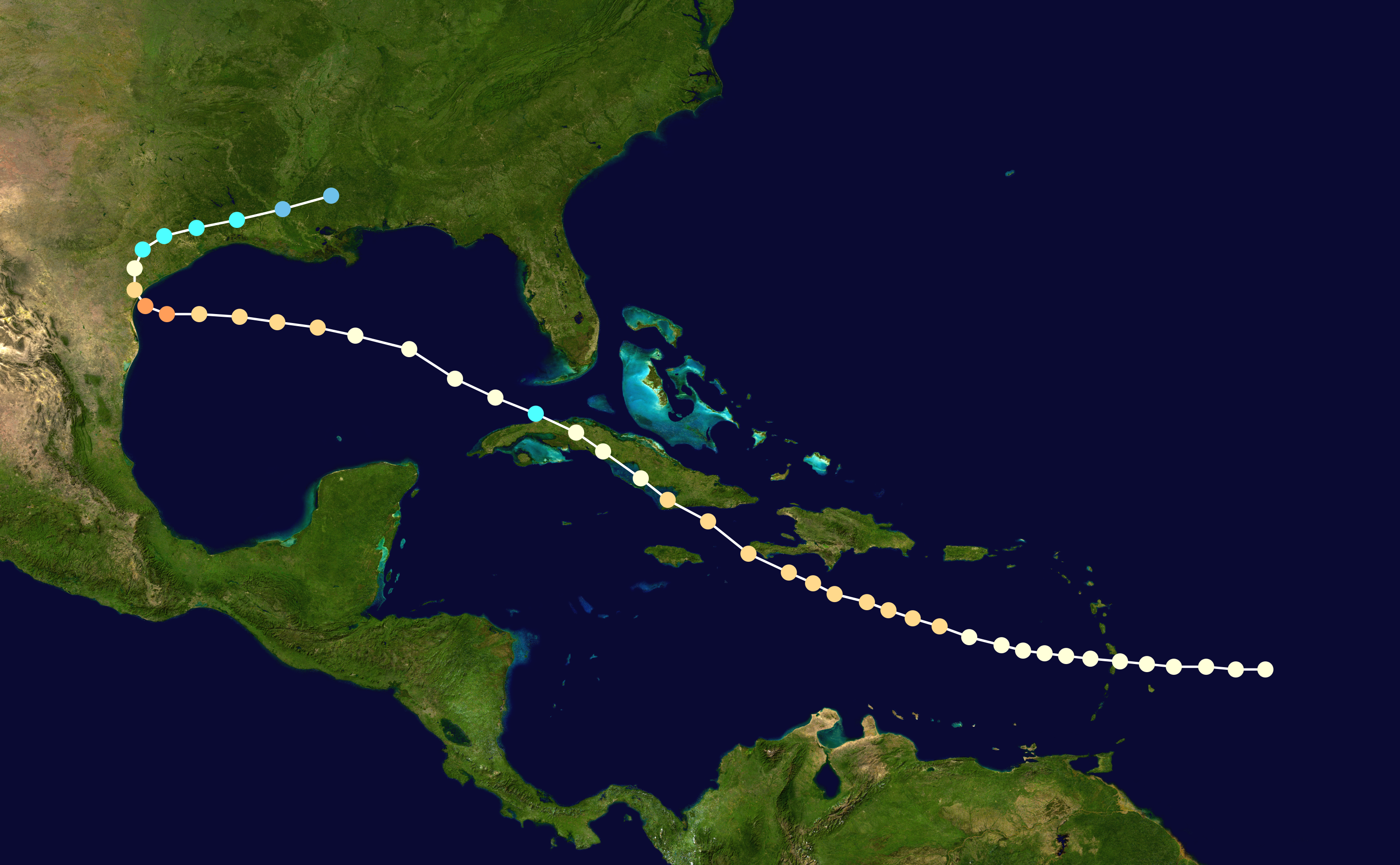
Map plotting the storm's track and intensity, according to the Saffir–Simpson scale Map key Saffir–Simpson scale Tropical depression (≤38 mph, ≤62 km/h) Tropical storm (39–73 mph, 63–118 km/h) Category 1 (74–95 mph, 119–153 km/h) Category 2 (96–110 mph, 154–177 km/h) Category 3 (111–129 mph, 178–208 km/h) Category 4 (130–156 mph, 209–251 km/h) Category 5 (≥157 mph, ≥252 km/h) Unknown Storm type Tropical cyclone Subtropical cyclone Extratropical cyclone, remnant low, tropical disturbance, or monsoon depression

The hurricane or its precursor was first observed on September 1 by the ship Tautallon Castle, which was located southwest of Cape Verde. The storm moved westward and was later encountered on September 5 by a vessel which observed "terrific seas" and a barometric pressure of 982 mbar (29.0 inHg). However, HURDAT – the Atlantic hurricane database – does not confirm the existence of a tropical cyclone until 00:00 UTC on September 8, while the storm was situated about 285 miles (459 km) east-northeast of Barbados. Initially estimated to have been a Category 1 hurricane on the modern-day Saffir–Simpson scale, the system moved westward to west-northwestward, passing through the Windward Islands between Martinique and St. Lucia early on September 9. The cyclone was estimated to have intensified into a Category 2 hurricane around 00:00 UTC on September 11. Thereafter, the system began moving in a more northwestward direction. Late on September 12, the hurricane brushed the Tiburon Peninsula of Haiti.

Continuing northwestward, the cyclone made landfall near Pilón, Cuba, with winds of 105 mph (169 km/h), shortly before 06:00 UTC on September 13. The storm briefly re-emerged into the Caribbean and weakened to a Category 1 hurricane before making landfall on the south coast of modern-day Sancti Spíritus Province around 18:00 UTC with winds of 90 mph (140 km/h). Early the following day, the system emerged into the Straits of Florida and weakened to a tropical storm at about 06:00 UTC on September 14, before becoming a Category 1 hurricane again six hours later. Early on September 15, the cyclone curved to the west-northwest and re-intensified further, becoming a Category 2 hurricane again by 12:00 UTC. About 24 hours later, the system intensified into a Category 3 hurricane and peaked with maximum sustained winds of 115 mph (185 km/h). Around 21:00 UTC on September 16, the hurricane made landfall near Indianola, Texas, at the same intensity. Based on sustained winds of 115 mph (185 km/h) and the pressure–wind relationship developed by National Hurricane Center meteorologist Dan Brown in 2006, the barometric pressure was estimated at 955 mbar (28.2 inHg), the lowest associated with the storm. The hurricane curved northward after moving inland and quickly weakened to a tropical storm by 12:00 UTC the next day. Turning northeastward shortly thereafter, the system weakened to a tropical depression on September 18 and dissipated over southern Mississippi around 18:00 UTC that same day.

== Preparations and impact ==
=== Caribbean ===
In Saint Vincent, the hurricane was "accompanied by a deluge of rain unprecedented", with nearly 12 in (300 mm) of precipitation falling in 12 hours. Loss of lives and severe damage to properties were reported by The Times. Landslides occurred throughout the island, causing heavy damage, especially to agriculture. At one plantation alone, the storm destroyed nearly 15 acres (6.1 ha) of sugar cane. A number of roads were left impassible. The storm also demolished several arrowroot mills, which were generally owned by poor Black cultivators. In the Kingstown area, local streams, some of which typically resembled arroyos, rose as much as 12 ft (3.7 m) in six hours. Most of the streets were flooded with over 3 ft (0.91 m) of water, while marketplaces and low-lying areas were also inundated. Many homes and two bridges were swept away. At the Roman Catholic cemetery, floodwaters unearthed several recently interred bodies and swept them into the ocean. Along the coast, seven of the ten vessels docked at the bay were beached. In the Mariaqua Valley of Saint Vincent, hundreds of people fled their homes from the villages of Hopewell and Mesopotamia. Water swept away more than 30 homes in total from both villages. Four people drowned in Mesopotamia. Additionally, five fatalities occurred in Queensbury. During the storm, the volcano La Soufrière showed signs of activation. Following the storm, the Legislative Assembly of Saint Vincent voted to allocate £500 (equivalent to £49,882 in 2025) for repairing roads and £300 (equivalent to £29,929 in 2025) for relief to those whose homes were destroyed. A total of 52 people were granted aid, many of whom lived in Mesopotamia.

In Barbados, several locations reported around 13 in (330 mm) of precipitation, while up to 15 in (380 mm) of rain was observed. Three vessels on the island were driven ashore. The ship Codfish sank at a harbor in Martinique, drowning all 20 crew members. In Haiti, the schooner Agnes became stranded at Les Cayes. Additionally, several coasters and two foreign ships were grounded. Heavy rainfall and strong winds were also reported on Navassa Island. Many trees were brought down and several homes were destroyed. One building was lifted and smashed, and all wooden structures were demolished. The railroad was torn up, while eight loaded train cars were tossed from the track. A flat stone weighing 25 tons disappeared during the storm. Along the coast, waves crashed over cliffs that were 45 to 75 ft (14 to 23 m) in height. Boathouses and wharves were demolished, while a gig and eight lighters capsized. The storm caused an estimated $25,000 (equivalent to $732,955 in 2025) in damage to the island's phosphate mining infrastructure and company-owned buildings. Jamaica experienced storm surge, heavy rainfall, and near-hurricane-force winds. In Falmouth, storm surge inundated roads. Adverse weather conditions briefly interrupted communications between Holland Bay and Kingston, as well as between Holland Bay and Santiago de Cuba.

The Belen College Observatory in Havana, Cuba, issued a storm warning on September 11, as forecasters anticipated that the hurricane would continue west-northwestward and strike the island. This was the first issuance of a tropical cyclone-related warning in the Caribbean Sea. The well-publicized warning was credited with saving many lives. Tides in Cuba reached 3 ft (0.91 m) above normal at the bay in Santiago de Cuba. A severe thunderstorm associated with the hurricane killed a girl, and injured two men at a fishing village. The hurricane destroyed a section of railroad in Guantánamo. Strong winds and above normal tides left damage across the island, particularly in Júcaro and Santa Cruz del Sur. In the latter, the tides inundated many streets. Strong winds destroyed all shacks and partially damaged even the strongest buildings.

=== United States ===
In Louisiana, the hurricane sunk or swept ashore several ships along the coast. Even at the protected New Orleans harbor, ships foundered. Communications with the schooner Mabel was lost after it sailed out of the mouth of the Mississippi River. The state experienced more intense impacts after the storm moved eastward out of Texas. At Shell Island, located near the west end of Vermilion Bay, tides exceeded those during the 1856 hurricane. In New Orleans, the steamer Natchez collided with the ferry Lousie. The boats linked together and drifted down the Mississippi River, until the Natchez was re-secured after passing the Belle Rowland and the C. H. Dufree. In St. Mary Parish, 34 hours of heavy rainfall and storm surge generated by "tremendous equinoctial storm" caused considerable damage to cotton and sugar cane. Inland, observers in Calcasieu Parish noted that the wind shifted with "terrific force" as the storm crossed Louisiana.

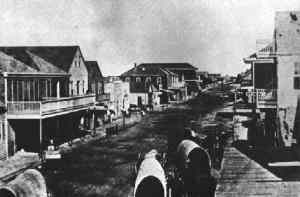
Indianola, Texas, in 1875

The storm brought a strong storm surge to the Texas coast, causing heavy damage and a total of 800 deaths. Three-quarters of the buildings in Indianola were washed away and the remaining structures were in a state of ruin, with only eight buildings left undamaged. Boats were washed as far as 9 miles (14 km) inland. The town may have experienced winds gusts between 145 and 150 mph (233 and 241 km/h), though the anemometer blew away after recording a wind gust of 88 mph (142 km/h).

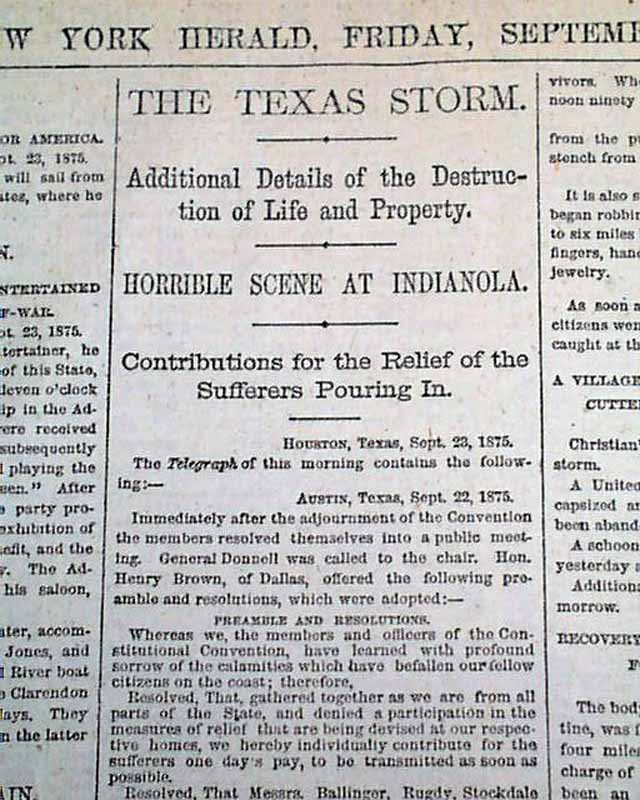
The New York Herald newspaper published on September 24, 1875, regarding the aftermath of the hurricane

Approximately 270 people were killed in Indianola. In the aftermath of the storm in Indianola, looters stole possessions from the deceased. Fifteen people caught looting from the dead were killed. Surviving residents of Indianola debated relocating the town. However, considerations were dropped after political ambitions interfered. The town would be rebuilt, only to be completely destroyed by the 1886 hurricane. In Cameron County, damage to a railroad resulted in a suspension of service between Brownsville and Port Isabel. The sand dunes on Matagorda Island were flattened. The hurricane killed approximately 90% of residents of Saluria, located on the eastern end of the island. Two lighthouses at Pass Cavallo were swept away, including the four light keepers. Velasco was completely leveled. The city was not rebuilt until 1888, at which time it had been relocated about 4 miles (6.4 km) farther upstream the Brazos River.

At Galveston, tides reached up to 10 ft (3.0 m) above normal, cutting two temporary channels across the island. Several houses on the eastern side of the island and a railroad bridge were destroyed. In Galveston Bay, the steamer Beardstown sunk. The storm dropped 6.48 in (165 mm) of rainfall on September 17 – a record for that date. Winds possibly reached 110 mph (180 km/h), with the wind being "higher and harder" than during the 1867 hurricane.

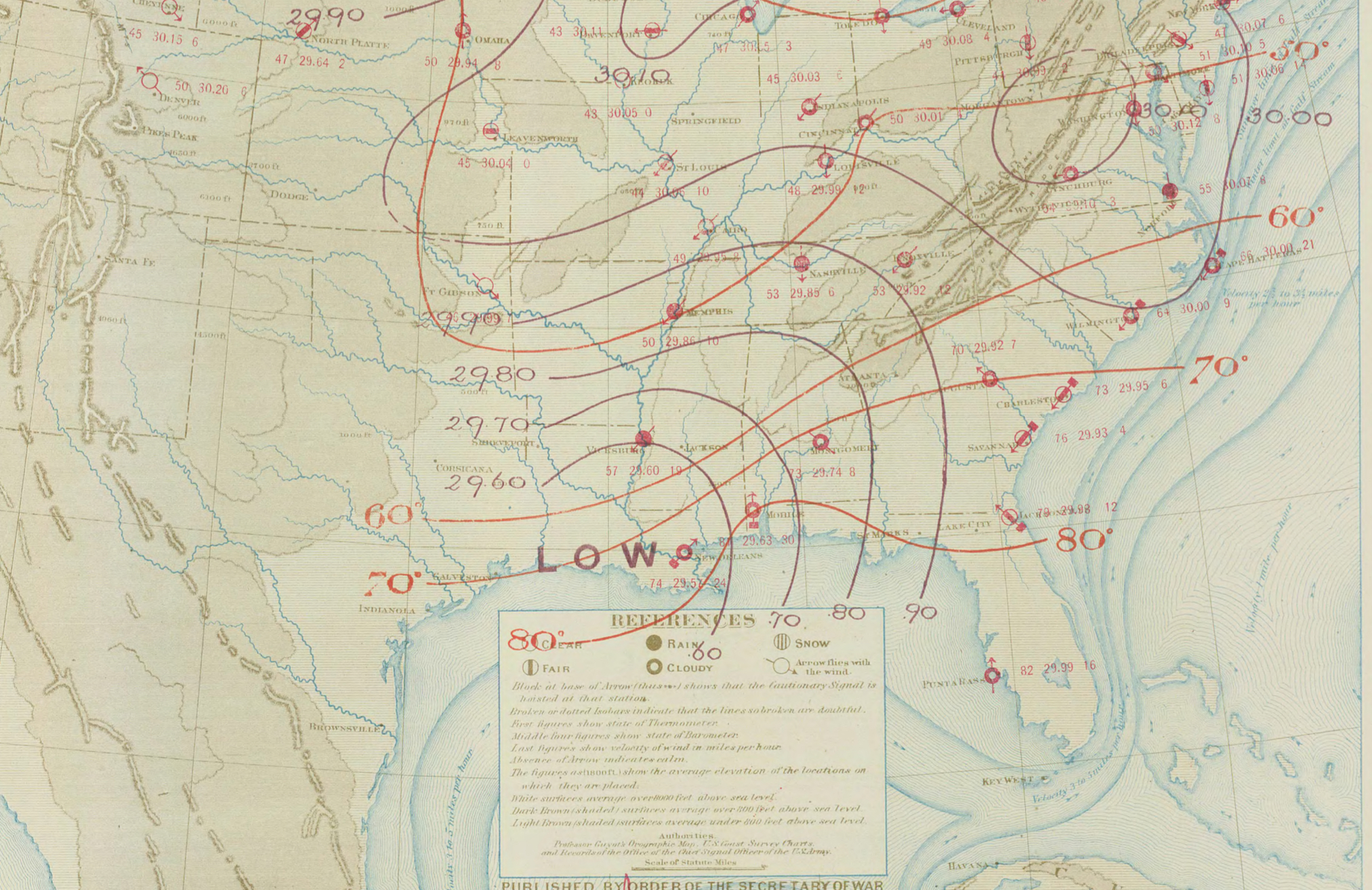
Weather map of the storm over Louisiana on September 18

Farther north, Harrisburg and Houston were impacted by the hurricane. Water from Galveston Bay at Houston swept farther inland than ever recorded at the time. Trees were brought down throughout the city, with some streets resembling "forests just cut down", according to The Daily News. Fallen trees and fences blocked sidewalks on Congress Street. A number of homes were deroofed. Three buildings at the fairgrounds were destroyed. Heavy rainfall flooded some streets. Two bridges over White Oak Bayou were washed away, while a few houses along the bank of the bayou were also swept away. Damage in Houston reached about $50,000 (equivalent to $34.62 million in 2025). In Spring, heavy precipitation caused streams to overflow and streets to quickly flood, with The Daily News noting that floodwaters took "almost everything within its reach." A combination of strong winds and torrential rains damaged several miles of railroad tracks and washed out several roads. Cotton crops were completely wiped out. In Wallisville, several buildings were demolished, while moderate damage occurred in Beaumont and Liberty. Strong winds buffeted Austin County for about 48 hours, causing severe damage to vegetation and downing many trees.

Hurricane warning flags

The storm left a lasting impact on warnings being issued for hurricanes. Within the United States, the public was dissatisfied with the Signal Corp forecasts after the Indianola hurricane. The immediate response by the Signal Corp was the creation of the hurricane warning flag, a pair of red flags 10 by 8 ft (3.0 by 2.4 m) each in size, inset with black rectangles. From October 1, 1875, hurricane warning flags were hoisted in areas where hurricane warnings were in effect, and illuminated at night.

== See also ==
- 1886 Indianola hurricane - A powerful storm that completely destroyed Indianola after making landfall as a Category 4 hurricane
- 1900 Galveston hurricane - A powerful and deadly Texas hurricane which devastated Galveston with storm surge
- 1915 Galveston hurricane - A storm which impacted similar areas to the 1900 hurricane, but with lesser devastation and fewer deaths
- Hurricane Ella (1958) - A storm with a path similar to the 1875 Indianola hurricane, but at a much weaker intensity
- Hurricane Ike (2008) - A powerful Category 4 hurricane that made a devastating landfall in Galveston as a Category 2
- History of Atlantic hurricane warnings
