= 1886 Indianola hurricane =

Category 4 Atlantic hurricane in 1886

Hurricane Five
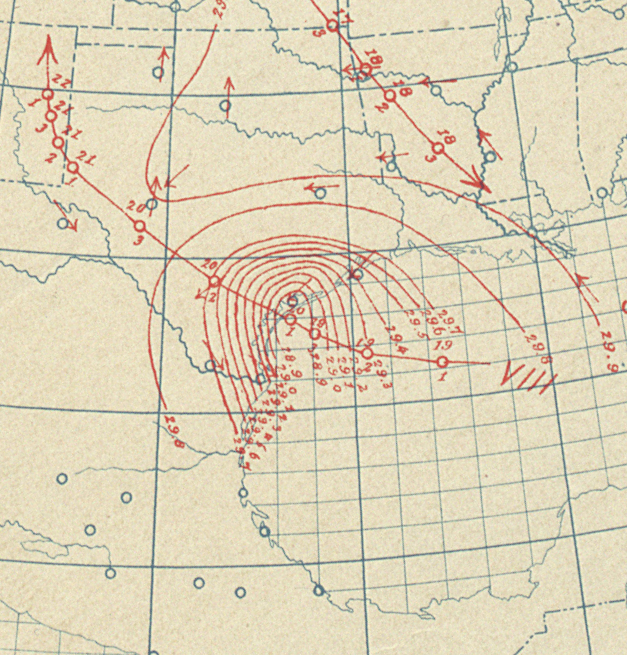
- Map of isobars associated with the hurricane on August 20, near landfall on the United States Gulf Coast

Meteorological history
- Formed: August 12, 1886
- Dissipated: August 21, 1886

Category 4 major hurricane
- 1-minute sustained (SSHWS/NWS)
- Highest winds: 150 mph (240 km/h)
- Lowest pressure: 925 mbar (hPa); 27.32 inHg (estimated)

Overall effects
- Fatalities: 178
- Damage: ~$3.22 million (1886 USD)
- Areas affected: Lesser Antilles; Dominican Republic; Haiti; Cuba; Florida; Texas
- IBTrACS /
- Part of the 1886 Atlantic hurricane season

The 1886 Indianola hurricane was the most powerful Atlantic hurricane to hit the U.S. state of Texas, as measured by atmospheric pressure, causing numerous fatalities and severe damage, mostly around the town of Indianola. The fifth tropical cyclone and hurricane of the annual season, it developed near the Lesser Antilles on August 12 and tracked generally northwest, becoming a hurricane with winds of 100 mph (150 km/h) before striking Hispaniola three days later. The storm dropped heavy rain on the island, causing riparian flooding. Weakening over land, it turned west-northwest and then northwest, regaining intensity before crossing eastern Cuba on August 16. It caused moderate wind damage and 28 deaths on the island, brushing the Florida Keys with modest gales. Resuming a west-northwest course, it strengthened over the Gulf of Mexico, peaking with winds of 150 mph (240 km/h) on August 19, just before moving ashore Texas.

Statewide the storm killed 150 people and spread destruction well inland, with a 15-foot (4.6 m) storm surge engulfing Indianola. At least 46 deaths were reported in Indianola. Hundreds of homes were dismantled there and in neighboring communities, in part due to a fire that ignited during the storm. Fierce winds snarled communication between towns, while felling buildings and trees. Corn, cotton, and fruit crops were heavily damaged, with up to 15% cotton losses in some areas. A few ships were disabled, resulting in at least five deaths. The storm dropped prolific rain as well, causing flash floods, notably in riparian areas, and ending a dry spell. Part of a severe storm series since 1875, the cyclone contributed to the end of Indianola as a town. It also impacted the history and economic development of Texas, with Galveston replacing Indianola as the main port in the state. Losses from the storm totaled about $3 million in contemporary USD.

== Meteorological history ==
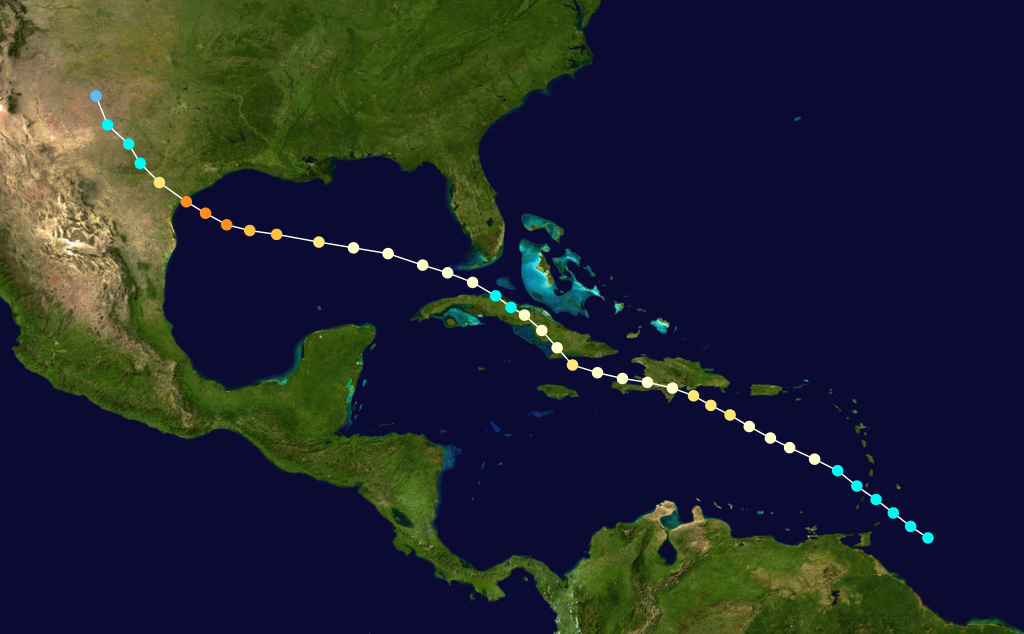
Map plotting the storm's track and intensity, according to the Saffir–Simpson scale Map key Saffir–Simpson scale Tropical depression (≤38 mph, ≤62 km/h) Tropical storm (39–73 mph, 63–118 km/h) Category 1 (74–95 mph, 119–153 km/h) Category 2 (96–110 mph, 154–177 km/h) Category 3 (111–129 mph, 178–208 km/h) Category 4 (130–156 mph, 209–251 km/h) Category 5 (≥157 mph, ≥252 km/h) Unknown Storm type Tropical cyclone Subtropical cyclone Extratropical cyclone, remnant low, tropical disturbance, or monsoon depression

The storm formed about 205 mi (330 km) south-southeast of Barbados, the easternmost Caribbean island, on August 12, as shown by the Atlantic hurricane reanalysis project. (Note: A 2014 study by Michael Chenoweth began the storm a bit farther east, but its results have not yet been adopted into HURDAT.) At that time, the hurricane databases (HURDAT) initiate a weak tropical storm. The cyclone moved northwest over the next three days and steadily intensified. It crossed the Windward Islands on August 13, becoming a minimal hurricane later that day; (Note: HURDAT records tropical cyclone tracks and intensities.) weather forecasters first noted the storm on this date. Next day the ship Gertie M. Rickerson first sampled hurricane speeds, at which time sustained winds in the storm reached 100 mph (155 km/h), or low-end Category 2 status on the Saffir–Simpson scale.

A day later it struck Barahona, Dominican Republic, at the same intensity. Its ensuing path turned west-northwest across southern Haiti and then northwest toward southeastern Cuba. Weakening inland, it regained its peak winds over the Windward Passage and hit Cuba on August 16. The following day it resumed a west-northwest heading, reemerging offshore northern Cuba near Isabela de Sagua with winds of 65 mph (100 km/h). (Note: Chenoweth outlined a path farther north, grazing easternmost Cuba, and showed a tropical storm impacting the Dominican Republic.) Once over the Straits of Florida it restrengthened, reattaining hurricane winds next day; then it reached the Gulf of Mexico.

On August 19 it commenced rapid intensification, strengthening into a major hurricane. (Note: Category 3 or above on the Saffir–Simpson scale.) Next day it curved northwest, peaking with winds of 150 mph (240 km/h), or upper-end Category 4 status. At 13:00 UTC it hit the southern end of Matagorda Island, Texas, at a point 30 mi (50 km) southwest of Indianola. (Note: By sustained winds the storm tied the 1932 Freeport hurricane as the strongest Texas hurricane on record.) Scientists modeled a pressure of 925 mb (27.3 inHg) at landfall, based on a barometer reading of 971 mb (28.7 inHg) taken six hours later at the edge of the eye in San Antonio; (Note: Other sources list 983 mb (29.03 inHg).) this made it the most intense Texas hurricane on record. (Note: Meteorologist Ivan Ray Tannehill listed the storm as a "Great Hurricane", with a pressure of 28 inHg (950 mb) or lower and heavy wind damage extending at least 50 to 100 mi (80 to 161 km) outward; however, a 1989 study by Francis P. Ho noted a smaller-than-usual storm size, as shown by a narrow hurricane-force wind swath.) Reanalysis derived the storm's winds from a blend of tidal and pressure data, along with a compact radius of maximum wind (RMW). The storm quickly unraveled over land, losing hurricane force on August 21, and gently arced north-northwest. It vanished later that day over the Texas panhandle.

== Impact and aftermath ==
In Hispaniola, the storm produced hurricane-force winds at Santo Domingo, along with a pressure of 29.54 inHg (1,000 mb) and copious rains that caused the Ozama River to overflow. In Cuba, the storm claimed 28 lives, and losses totaled $100,000 in Sagua la Grande. A death and several injuries occurred in Santa Clara. Strong winds knocked down trees and chimneys across the island, along with some homes near Havana. The center of the storm passed over Isabela de Sagua, attended by a lull in the winds, which peaked at 60 mph (97 km/h) in Cárdenas. Ships over the Straits of Florida clocked winds of 75 to 80 mph (121 to 129 km/h). The storm passed 25 mi (40 km) off the Dry Tortugas, the westernmost of the Florida Keys, generating winds of 48 mph (77 km/h) in Key West, but only slight damage.

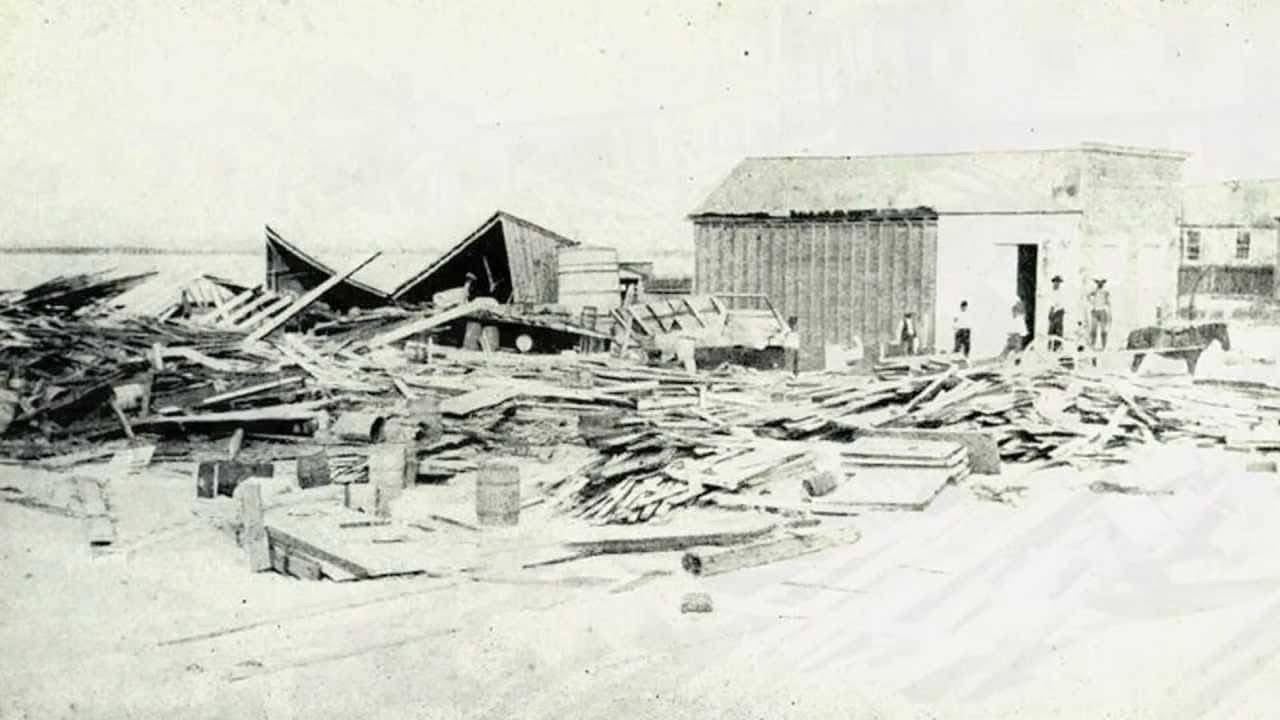
Ruins in Indianola after the hurricane

In Texas, the storm wreaked property destruction in a number of coastal and inland towns, resulting in 150 deaths. At Indianola 46 deaths were confirmed, as only six homes endured unscathed. Winds leveled a Signal Corps office, killing an officer. A fire in the office spread, consuming all but two buildings abutting the street. Tides on Matagorda Bay exceeded an 1875 storm, effacing 2 1/2 mi (4.0 km) of track bed, impeding communication, and complicating rescue efforts. Storm surge rose 15 ft (4.6 m), carrying boats up to 5 mi (8.0 km) ashore. Winds topped the 1875 storm but lasted shorter, though wind and surge combined to level the town, along with all homes except a lifesaving station on upper Matagorda Island. The surge moved homes off their foundations, leaving few fit for habitation. Storm debris, human bodies, and animal carcasses littered the landscape. Almost all sheep and cattle perished on Matagorda Island. The storm leveled the nearby village of Quintana—at the Brazos River mouth—as well, besides 15 homes at Lavaca, and the Matagorda Island Light lay 4 ft (1.2 m) underwater at its base.

Most intense landfalling tropical cyclones in the United States (measured by central pressure)
Rank	System	Season	Landfall pressure
1	"Labor Day"	1935	892 mbar (hPa)
2	Camille	1969	900 mbar (hPa)
2	Yutu	2018	900 mbar (hPa)
4	Michael	2018	919 mbar (hPa)
5	Katrina	2005	920 mbar (hPa)
5	Maria	2017	920 mbar (hPa)
5	Sinlaku	2026	920 mbar (hPa)
8	Andrew	1992	922 mbar (hPa)
9	"Indianola"	1886	925 mbar (hPa)
10	"Guam"	1900	926 mbar (hPa)
Source: HURDAT, Hurricane Research Division

In Galveston tides overshot the 1875 storm, undermining streets, railways, bridges, culverts, outbuildings, tanks, several hundred homes, and resorts, such as the Beach Hotel and plaza. Hotel and waterfront losses totaled $500,000 (equivalent to $15.4 million in 2024). Caged animals at the hotel drowned, but a pair of Mexican lions broke loose and were shot. The schooner J. W. Perry lost two of its crew, a few of whom floated ashore barely alive. On the Livonia Perkins, which capsized, three more died; one crew member swam about 10 mi (16 km) to safety. Strong winds knocked down wires and trees on Galveston Island, disrupting communication. In all, 300 homes on the beach were destroyed and 1,000 others rendered uninhabitable. On the mainland Buffalo Bayou overflowed, rising 5 to 6 ft (1.5 to 1.8 m) above normal at Houston. At Corpus Christi winds reached an estimated 75 mph (121 km/h), flattening a railroad office, a church, large trees, outbuildings, and fences. On Harbor Island water lay 6 ft (1.8 m) deep, forcing 100 railroad workers to depart. Seven drownings were reported. Offshore winds blew water out of Corpus Christi Bay for a few hours, stranding vessels. 16 homes floated off their foundations at Rockport, where the storm also tore apart six or seven houses, a cistern factory, and a temperance hall.

Many interior locales in South Texas deemed the storm their worst to date. Many homes lost their roofs in Goliad. Much cotton, corn, and fruit damage was reported in La Grange, Weimar, and Bexar County, where a church was torn apart. Homes in Beeville sustained damage, such as torn-off roofs, and crop damage occurred. Cuero was badly damaged, and homes were leveled in Edna. At Floresville the storm razed 10 homes, and an overflowing stream carried away a couple, one of whom drowned. At New Braunfels the storm wrecked a freight depot. Losses up to $15,000 occurred in Seguin, where a church tower was downed and several buildings were severely damaged or destroyed. Fallen trees killed a person and badly injured two others at Sutherland Springs, where cotton crops were "whipped into shreds". The storm wrecked homes, fences, and trees at Luling, with a 15% cotton loss at Hempstead. San Antonio losses reached $2 1/2 million, including flooded basements. Rainfall amounted to 4.4 in (110 mm), and small hail fell, with peak winds of 60 mph (97 km/h).

In Victoria the storm destroyed or damaged most of the buildings. An estimated 75 houses were destroyed and another 118 were damaged. The town's jail and high school were both damaged while the freight station, Masonic hall, and "colored" section of town were "almost literally swept from the earth". A freight train was overturned. Winds razed a few churches, badly damaged six others, and tore the roofs off two of them, while toppling steeples. The storm uprooted most vegetation, and several injuries ensued from flying debris or collapsed buildings. Fallen telegraph wires severed contact with the outside world. No deaths were reported in the town, but the initial damages were estimated at $100,000 and the citizens of the town declared the hurricane "the most terrible storm ever known in Victoria". Due to torrential rain, the storm ended an ongoing drought, relieving dehydrated residents.

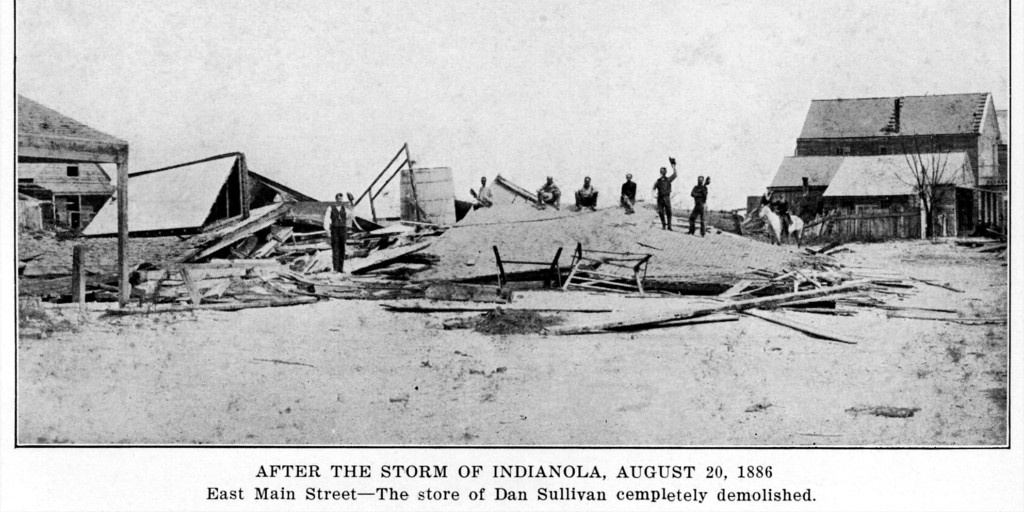
Remains of a store in Indianola

Many of Indianola's residents relocated farther inland after the storm. Five weeks later, in September 1886, another hurricane hit the Texas coast between Brownsville and Corpus Christi. Indianola was again flooded by rainwater and storm surge from Matagorda Bay. The remaining residents were evacuated. Following this storm the post office at Indianola was shut down, marking the official abandonment of the town, to be replaced by Galveston as the main Texas port. The storm ended the rivalry between Galveston and Indianola as the chief port of Texas. With the abandonment of Indianola and the unwillingness of the former residents to rebuild close to shore, Galveston became the most important Texan port until the catastrophic damage wrought there by the 1900 Galveston hurricane led to the rise of Houston as a major port on the Texan coast.

== See also ==
- 1942 Matagorda hurricane – Affected nearly the same area
- 1945 Texas hurricane – Paralleled the coast nearby
- Hurricane Carla – The second-most-intense Texas hurricane
- List of Texas hurricanes (pre-1900)
