= Indianola, Texas =

Ghost town in Calhoun County, Texas, United States

Coordinates: 28°30′43″N 96°29′15″W

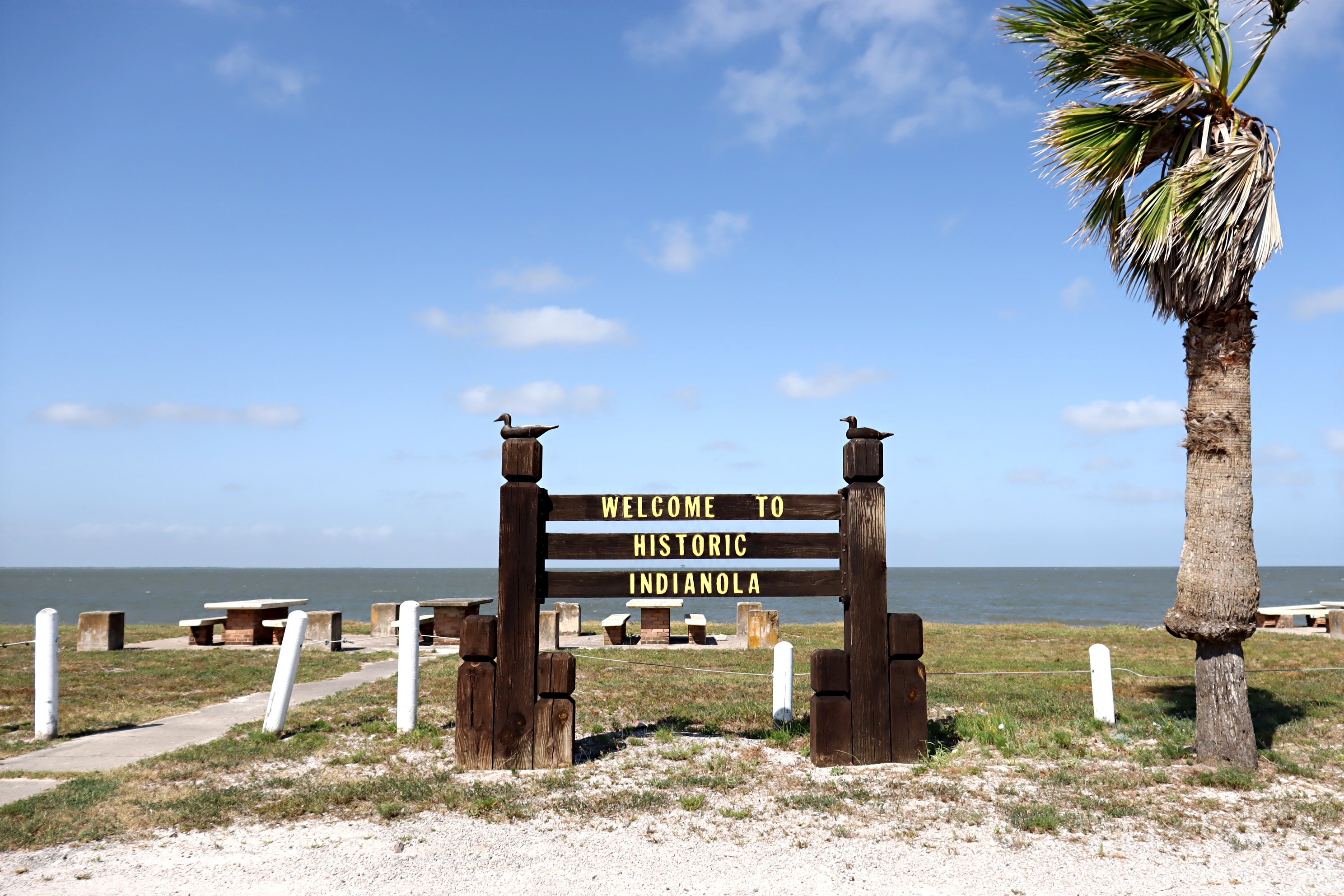
Indianola sign

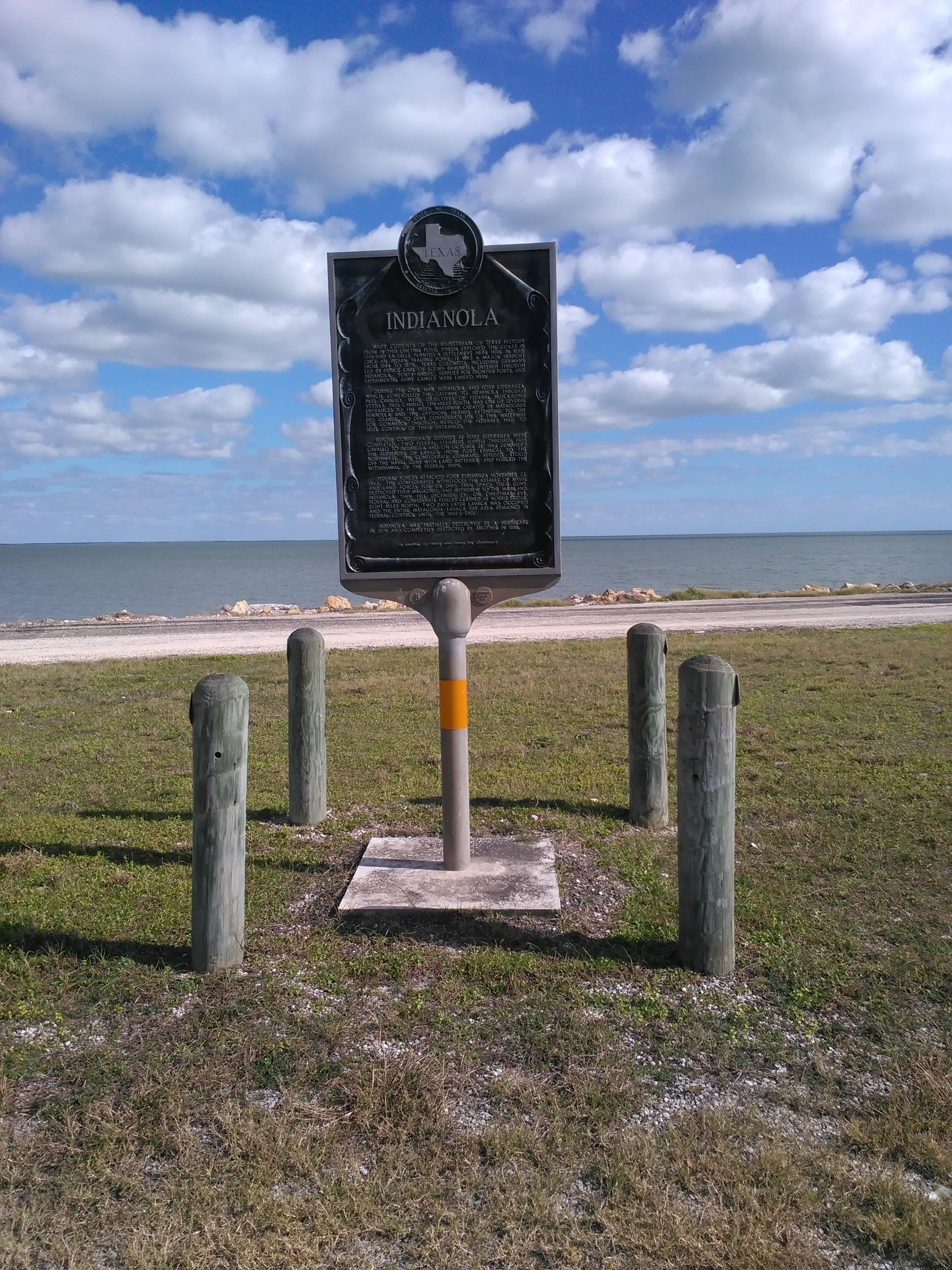
State historical marker for Indianola

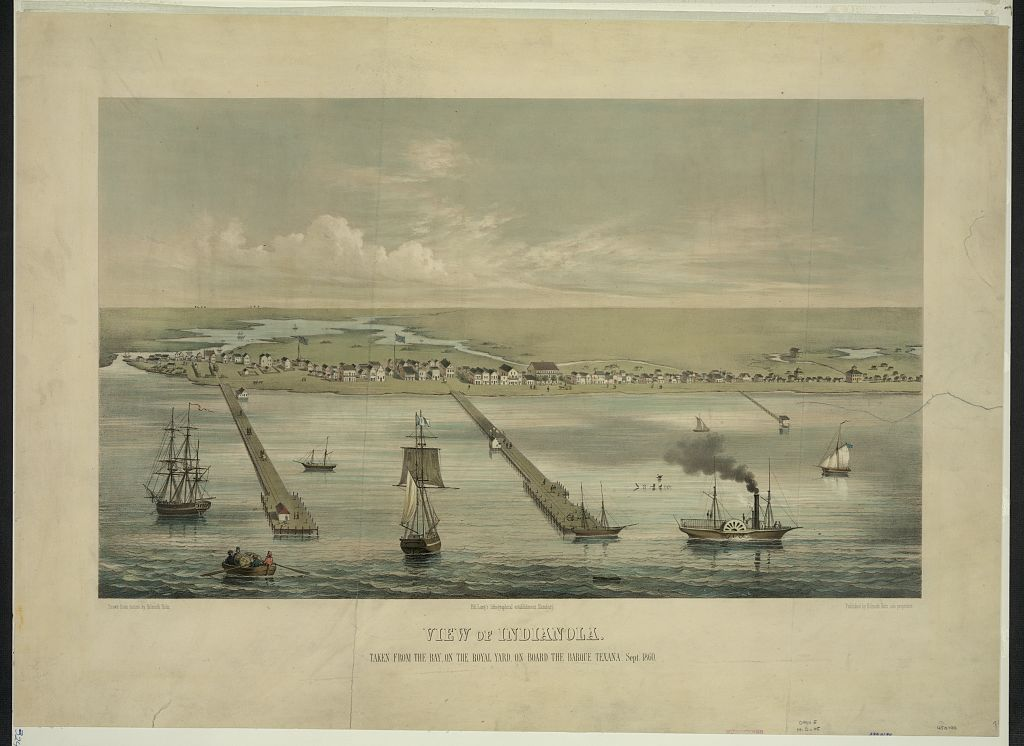
Indianola by Helmuth Holtz, Sept. 1860

Indianola is a ghost town located on Matagorda Bay in Calhoun County, Texas, United States. The community, once the county seat of Calhoun County, is a part of the Victoria, Texas metropolitan area. In 1875, the city had a population of 5,000, but on September 15 of that year, a powerful hurricane struck, killing between 150 and 300 and almost destroying the town. Indianola was rebuilt, only to be wiped out on August 19, 1886, by another intense hurricane followed by a fire. Indianola was designated a Recorded Texas Historic Landmark in 1963, marker number 2642. The site is also home to a statue of René-Robert Cavelier, Sieur de La Salle.

Indianola is now the site of a small unincorporated fishing village.

== History ==
=== German immigration port of entry ===
Prince Carl of Solms-Braunfels, representing the Adelsverein, selected Indian Point in December 1844 as the port of entry for the Verein colonists from Germany. Prince Solms renamed the port Carlshafen in honor of himself, Count Carl of Castell-Castell and Count Victor August of Leiningen-Westerburg-Alt-Leiningen whom Solms claimed had been christened Carl. Prince Solms' choice of Carlshafen and its inadequate accommodations as a port of entry, as well as the isolated route to New Braunfels, was to keep the Germans from interacting with any Americans. In February 1845 Henry Francis Fisher conspired with Dr. F. Schubbert to coerce incoming immigrants to sign legal documents disassociating themselves from the Verein and to join Schubbert's colony in Milam County.

In May 1846, John O. Meusebach received a letter from Count Castell informing him that 4,304 colonists were on their way to Texas. With no funds and no new settlements, the mass of emigrants was stalled at Carlshafen. Meusebach's requests to the Verein for more money, and his warnings at pending bankruptcy for the Verein, brought no results. As a last resort, Meusebach instructed D.H. Klaener to publish the plight in the German news media. Embarrassed by the publicity, the Verein established an inadequate $60,000 letter of credit. Meusebach had arranged with the Torrey Brothers for transporting the emigrants inland, but the United States hired the Torrey Brothers for use in the Mexican–American War. An epidemic of spinal meningitis broke out at Carlshafen and spread with the emigrants to New Braunfels and Fredericksburg.

Samuel Addition White and William M. Cook founded Indian Point, later Indianola, in August 1846. This settlement developed along a corridor of beachfront for twenty-three blocks. In 1849, the town changed its name from Indian Point to Indianola. In 1852, Calhoun County selected Indianola as its county seat. Some of these immigrants purchased land from Samuel White and established a settlement at Indian Point. The settlement's name was changed to Indianola in 1849 by combining the word Indian with ola, the Spanish word for "wave". The German immigrants continued to refer to the community as Carlshaven (Carl's Harbor) in honor of Prince Carl of Solms-Braunfels.

The city has given its name to Indianola, Iowa.

=== Post-German immigration years ===
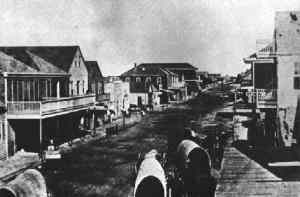
Indianola, Texas in 1875

From its founding in 1846, Indianola served as a major port, and before the 1875 storm was second only to Galveston, Texas, as Texas' primary port. Charles Morgan established Indianola as a port of call for his gulf coast steamship line in 1849.

The town was incorporated in 1853. In 1856, the port received cargoes of camels, part of the United States Camel Corps experiment to replace horses and mules as the primary pack animal in the southwestern parts of the country.

During the American Civil War, Indianola was twice occupied by Union troops, in October 1862 and November 1863. During the second occupation, part of a Union infantry regiment while moving from Indianola to Matagorda Island drowned in Matagorda Bay.

In 1869, the world's first mechanically refrigerated shipment of beef left Indianola for New Orleans.

During World War II, the United States Army constructed an anti-aircraft firing range along the Indianola shoreline to train gunners and the facility was used primarily by military personnel from Camp Hulen, located outside of Palacios.

=== Impact of storms ===
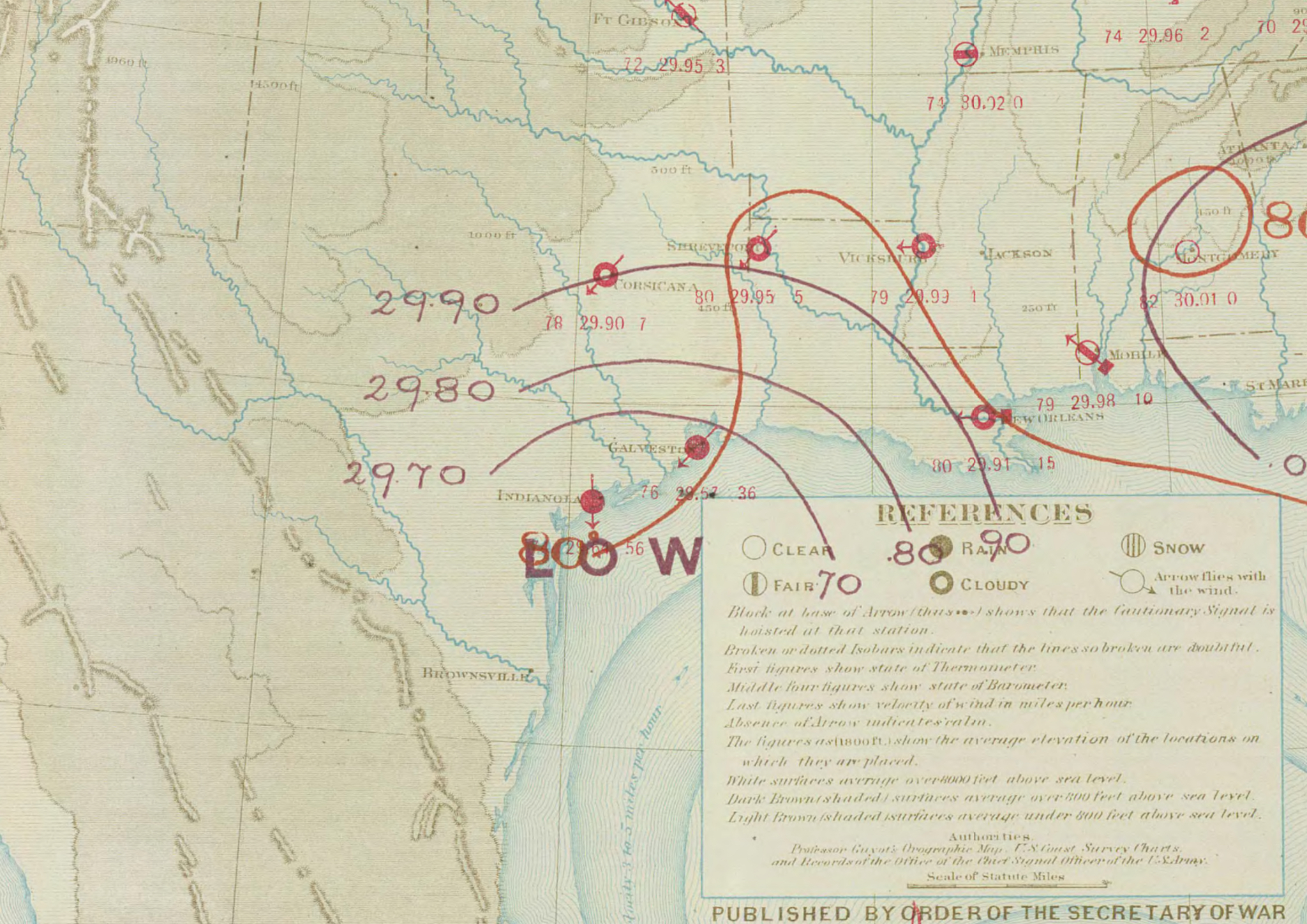
Weather map of the 1875 Indianola hurricane nearing landfall on September 16.

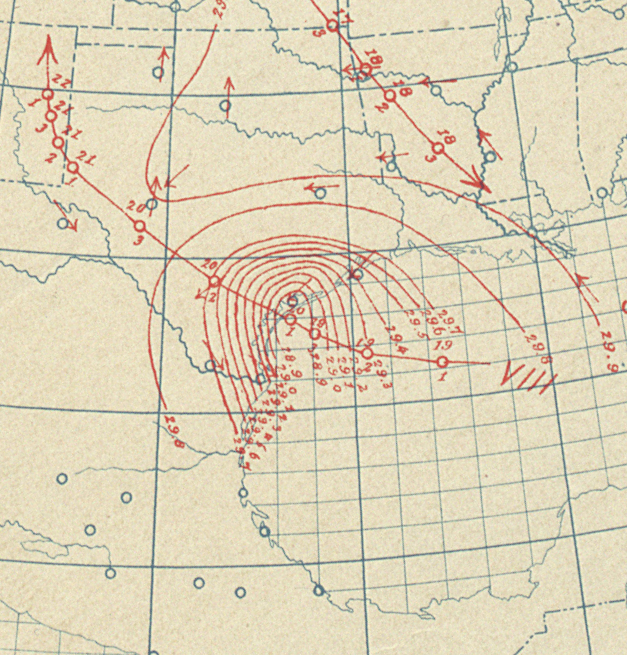
Weather map of the 1886 Indianola hurricane making landfall on August 20. Becoming one of the most powerful hurricanes to make landfall in the United States.

Having survived severe storms before, Indianola was almost totally destroyed on 16 September 1875. The New York Times reported in detail on the extensive loss of life and property. Even the lighthouses were swept away and the keepers, including Thomas H. Mayne and Edward Flick Jr. of the East Shoal Lighthouse, killed.

The town was rebuilt, but events were repeated in 1886. The destruction served as an abject lesson for many residents of Galveston, 100 miles up the Texas coast. However, their calls for a seawall to protect that city went unheeded, and Galveston nearly shared Indianola's fate when the Galveston Hurricane of 1900 struck the island.

The Indianola Railroad was proposed to connect the port of Indianola to San Antonio. After the two storms, discouraged investors abandoned the venture and made Galveston the port of choice. (After Galveston's hurricane, shipping traffic recentered over time to inland Houston).

After the 1886 storm, the county seat was moved to Port Lavaca. On October 4, 1887, the post office in Indianola was permanently closed and the town was declared "dead". Today, almost nothing remains of the original Indianola, as, due to storm erosion, most of the site of the city is now underwater. A granite marker was placed on the shore at the nearest point to the Indianola courthouse, now 300 feet (about 90 meters) away in Matagorda Bay. It reads, "Calhoun County Courthouse. Edward Beaumont, Architect 1859. During the Storms of 1875 and 1886, precious lives were saved within its walls of shell, concrete, and lime. Abandoned 1886."

== Popular culture ==
=== In literature ===
Frederick Olmsted describes Indianola in his 1860 memoir, Journey through Texas, with the following:

At the entrance are some prominent gables, and it was so like the approach to a European seaport that we thought of our passports and the octroi officers. The beach on which the town is built is some three hundred yards in width, and extends about a mile in length, having but two parallel streets, front and back. It has a more busy and prosperous appearance than Lavacca, and is much larger, but is said to have less heavy business, and less capital. The rivalry is extreme and amusing. At Lavacca we heard of Indianola as 'a little village down the bay (they call it Indianola), where our vessels land goods on their way up.' Each consider the other to be sickly. Indianola has the advantage of the best water, and of the New Orleans steamers, which land at Powderhorn, a sort of hotel suburb, four miles below, by a hard beach-road, where nine to ten feet of water can be carried. [...] We spent a quiet Sunday at Indianola. The beach beyond the town forms a pleasant promenade, and we enjoyed to the full the calm sunny sea, which seemed like a return to an old friend, after our months of inland journeying. Our hotel was a great improvement on that of the day before. The Germans, who compose half the population, have the enterprise to cultivate vegetable gardens, which furnish, at least, salads at all seasons. Around one of these gardens we noticed a hedge of enormous prickly pear. The native oysters are large and abundant. Game of all kinds is cheap.

Jefferson McLemore published Indianola and Other Poems in 1904.

In Elizabeth Hand's novel Aestival Tide, a reconstructed Indianola is featured as the lowermost level of the central ziggurat in the dome city of Araboth.

In the novel Matagorda by the author Louis L'Amour, much of the action took place in Indianola, Texas on the day it was destroyed by the 1875 hurricane. The courthouse, the site of which is now underwater out in the bay, was featured as the last refuge of the townspeople.

In Part I of Isaac's Storm, in the chapter "Galveston: An Absurd Delusion," Erik Larson describes the two storms that ravaged Indianola and the significance of these storms for Galveston, leading up to the Galveston storm of 1900. He notes: "At first, Galveston's leading men seemed to grasp the significance of the Indianola storms. Anyone who looked at a map could see that Galveston was even more vulnerable to destruction than Indianola. It had no picket of barrier islands to shelter it, no buffer of mainland prairie. The city faced the Gulf head-on." He further observes: "Six weeks after the second Indianola storm, a group of thirty prominent Galveston residents calling themselves the Progressive Association met and resolved to build a seawall", and "The city's Evening Tribune endorsed the plan". However, although "The state eventually did authorize a bond to pay for the work," the city's engineer E.M. Hartwick observed, "this was some months after the flood, and by then the attitude was, Oh, we'll never get another one--and they didn't build."

Larson criticizes meteorologist Isaac Cline (among others) for this failure. For example, Larson cites statements Cline published in the July 1891 Galveston News article, "West India Hurricanes":

If Galveston had any lingering anxiety about its failure to erect a seawall Isaac's 1891 article would have eased them. It was here that he belittled hurricane fears as the artifacts of 'an absurd delusion.' He was especially confident about storm surges. Galveston would escape harm, he argued, because the incoming water would spread first over the vast lowlands behind Galveston, on the Texas mainland north of the bay where the land was even closer to sea level. 'It would be impossible,' he wrote, 'for any cyclone to create a storm wave which could materially injure the city.'

Further, in Part III of Isaac's Storm, in a chapter titled "Ritter's Cafe: You Can't Frighten Me", Larson publishes the recollections of Mollie Cohen, whose impressions of the Galveston Storm of 1900 reminded her of the second Indianola hurricane:

'We had a storm like this in '86,' Mollie said, referring to the winds and rain that had reached Galveston from the last of the big Indianola hurricanes. 'My father's store on Market Street was flooded,' she said, casually.

=== In music ===
Singer/songwriter Charlie Robison included a song titled "Indianola" on the 1998 album Life of the Party. The song begins from the perspective of a German immigrant approaching Indianola by sea and chronicling details of the narrator's family. The narrator and his cousin attempt to traverse the South to join the Union Army in the American Civil War, though they encounter Rebel resistance in Indianola.

Singer/songwriter Brian Burns included the song "Indianola" on his 2004 album Heavy Weather. The lyrics chronicle the full life cycle of Indianola, with verses from the points of view of a personified Matagorda Bay, an immigrant who helped build the city (Johann), a worker who came to help "bury the lost souls who perished that day" (Isaac), and finally the songwriter himself visiting the site (Brian). It is unclear whether the "Johann" mentioned in verse three refers to the Johann Dethardt, the first ship to bring settlers into the area, or Johann Swartz, the owner/builder of the first home erected in what would become Indianola.

Alternative country singer/songwriter Scott Stutzman included a song titled "The Indianola Sway" on his 2016 single Halloween Sixteen (released under the alias Kasko Lunsford). The song likely takes place between the 1875 and 1886 hurricane.

=== In movies ===
Indianola is the town site in the Randolph Scott movie “The Texans.”

== Education ==
What is now Indianola is served by the Calhoun County Independent School District.

== See also ==
- Great Comanche Raid of 1840
- United States Camel Corps

== Bibliography ==
- Baughman, James P. (1968). Charles Morgan and the Development of Southern Transportation. Nashville: Vanderbilt University Press.
- King, Irene Marschall (1967). John O.Meusebach. University of Texas Press. ISBN 978-0-292-73656-6.
- Larson, Erik (1999). Isaac's Storm. Random House Publishing. ISBN 0-609-60233-0.
- McComb, David G. (2015). The City in Texas: A History. University of Texas Press. ISBN 978-0-292-76746-1.
- Morgenthaler, Jefferson (2007). The German Settlement of the Texas Hill Country. Mockingbird Books. ISBN 978-1-932801-09-5.
- Solms, Carl; Gish, Theodore G; Von-Maszweski, Wolfram M (2000). Voyage to North America, 1844-45: Prince Carl of Solms' Texas Diary of People, Places, and Events. University of North Texas Press. ISBN 978-1-57441-124-9.
