= History of Atlantic hurricane warnings =

Aspect of meteorological history

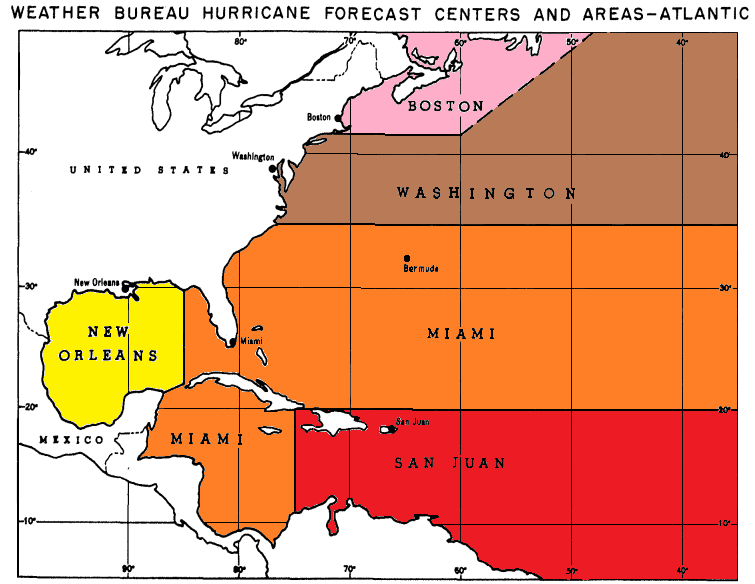
Hurricane Warning Offices and their areas of responsibility, c. 1959

The history of Atlantic tropical cyclone warnings details the progress of tropical cyclone warnings in the North Atlantic Ocean. The first service was set up in the 1870s from Cuba with the work of Father Benito Viñes. After his death, hurricane warning services were assumed by the US Army Signal Corps and United States Weather Bureau over the next few decades, first based in Jamaica and Cuba before shifting to Washington, D.C. The central office in Washington, which would evolve into the National Meteorological Center and the Weather Prediction Center, assumed the responsibilities by the early 20th century. This responsibility passed to regional hurricane offices in 1935, and the concept of the Atlantic hurricane season was established to keep a vigilant lookout for tropical cyclones during certain times of the year. Hurricane advisories issued every 12 hours by the regional hurricane offices began at this time.

The National Hurricane Center became a tropical cyclone warning center in 1956 and assumed many of the functions it has today by 1965. The National Hurricane Research Project, begun in the 1950s, used aircraft to study tropical cyclones and carry out experiments on mature hurricanes through its Stormfury project. Forecasts within the hurricane advisories were issued one day into the future in 1954 before being extended to two days into the future in 1961, three days into the future in 1964, and five days into the future in 2001. From the 1960s through the 1980s, work from the various regional hurricane offices was consolidated into the National Hurricane Center. Its name was changed to the Tropical Prediction Center in 1995, before reassuming its National Hurricane Center name in 2010. Tropical cyclone forecasting is done nowadays using statistical methods based on tropical cyclone climatology, as well as methods of numerical weather prediction where computers use mathematical equations of motion to determine their movement.

== Early years ==
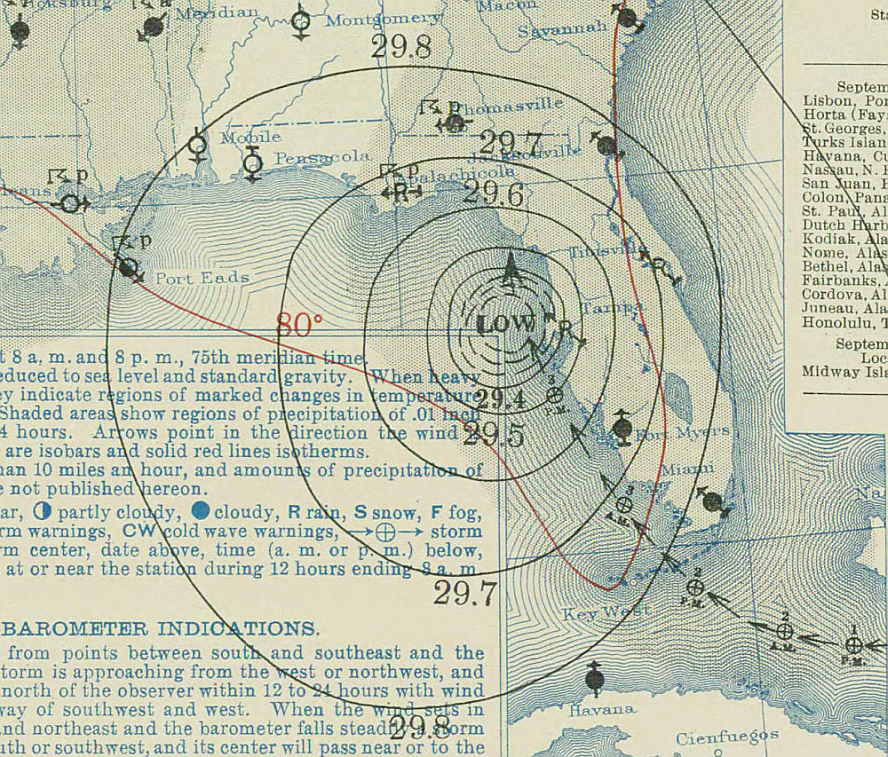
Weather Bureau surface weather map of the 1935 Labor Day Hurricane moving up the west coast of Florida

The first hurricane warning service was set up in the early 1870s from Cuba with the work of Father Benito Viñes, who served as director of the Meteorological Observatory of the Royal College of Belén. He established a network of observation sites and developed the first method to forecast tropical cyclone movement, with the oldest known warning for a tropical system made on August 23, 1873. This first warning alerted New England and the Mid-Atlantic states about a hurricane that would eventually strike Newfoundland. He would give track details days in advance, based upon clouds that progress well in advance of hurricanes. His hurricane warning service in Cuba continued until his death on July 23, 1893. Within the United States, the public was dissatisfied with the Signal Corp forecasts after the Hurricane of 1875. The immediate response by the Signal Corp was the creation of the hurricane warning flag, a pair of red flags ten by eight feet each in size, inset with black rectangles. Beginning on October 1, 1875, hurricane warning flags were hoisted in areas where hurricane warnings were in effect, and illuminated at night.

The United States Congress passed a bill to authorize the establishment and operations of weather stations across the West Indies and Caribbean Sea on July 7, 1889. The ultimate outcome was the advent of the Weather Bureau in 1890, through the passing of the Organic Act which assigned the new organization to the Department of Agriculture. The September 1896 hurricane led to an expansion of the Weather Bureau hurricane network through the Caribbean Sea. The Spanish–American War led to the United States establishing a hurricane warning office in Kingston, Jamaica in 1898, before shifting to Havana, Cuba after the war's end in 1899. After the 1900 Galveston Hurricane, a hurricane warning office was established at New Orleans, Louisiana to deal with hurricane warnings in the Gulf of Mexico. The Hurricane Warning Service moved to Washington, D. C. in 1902. The use of radio by shipping, which began in 1905, added significantly more information for those tracking hurricanes. The first report from a hurricane was received in 1909, with the total of radio reports rising to 21,000 per hurricane season in 1935. Despite the issuance of hurricane watches and warnings, forecasting the path of tropical cyclones did not occur until 1920.

Hurricane warning flag used in the United States

A hurricane warning program was established in 1935 and established regional offices in Jacksonville, Florida, Washington, D.C., San Juan, Puerto Rico, and New Orleans, Louisiana. Hurricane warning offices issued advisories at six hourly intervals for tropical cyclones, issuing warnings for storm and hurricane-force winds. The first aircraft reconnaissance of a hurricane (without penetrating the storm) was carried out in 1935 by Capt. Leonard Povey of the Cuban Army Air Corps. Although the United States Weather Bureau was encouraged by this flight to use aircraft to monitor hurricanes, a competing idea of using Coast Guard cutters to track hurricanes was put forth by Captain W. L. Farnsworth of the Galveston Commercial Association in the early 1930s. Farnsworth's "storm patrol bill" passed both the United States Senate and United States House of Representatives on June 15, 1936. However, no Coast Guard cutters ever penetrated a full hurricane as part of this patrol and the idea of using aircraft was moth-balled until 1943. The Jacksonville hurricane warning office moved to Miami, Florida in 1943, and a hurricane warning office was opened in Boston, Massachusetts. After World War II, the United States Navy and United States Air Force had separate warning centers for the military. In the case of tropical cyclones, the civilian and military warning agencies maintained close coordination. Tropical cyclone naming began for Atlantic tropical cyclones using the phonetic alphabet by 1947, switching to female names in 1953. Starting in 1950, the Miami Hurricane Warning Office began to prepare the annual hurricane season summary articles. Tropical cyclone track forecasts for one day in the future began in 1954. After the 1954 Atlantic hurricane season, efforts were made to enhance the hurricane reporting network along the coast by setting up a Cooperative Hurricane Reporting Network (CHURN) by supplying anemometers and barometers to members of the public which left no length of United States coastline along the Atlantic or Gulf coasts greater than 25 miles (40 km) uncovered.

=== Hurricane season concept ===
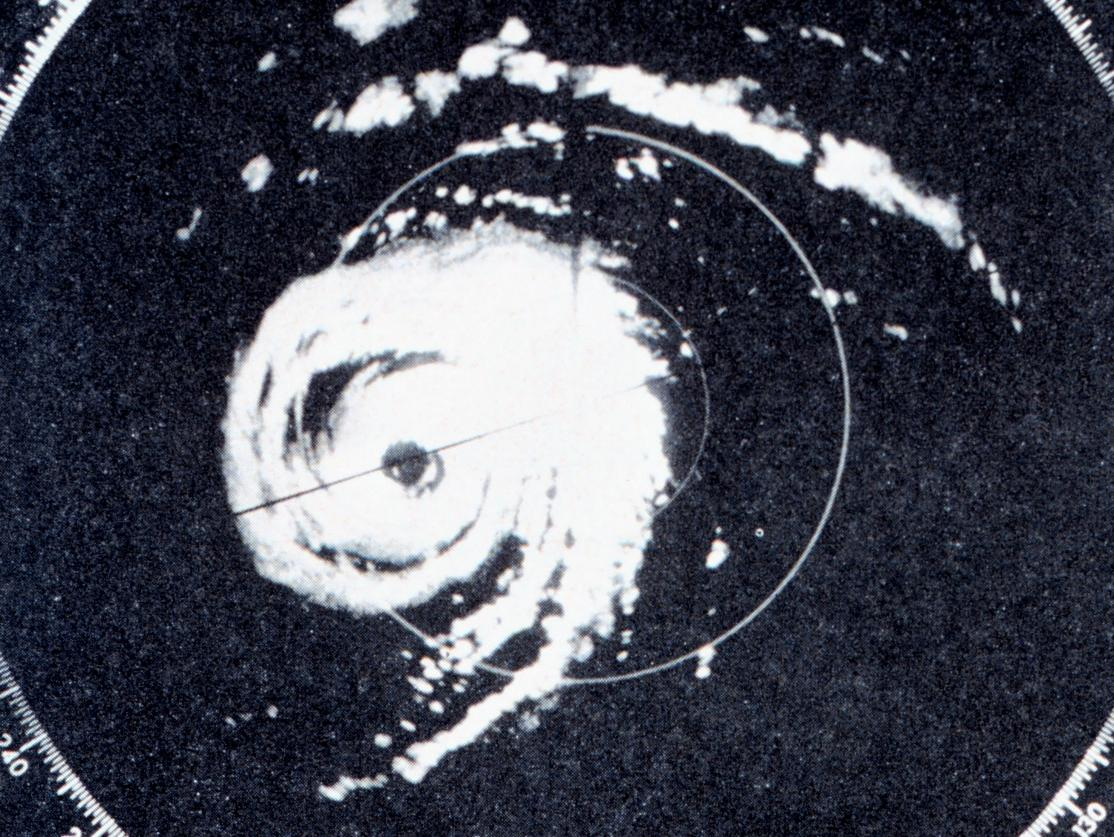
Radar image of Hurricane Donna (1960)

The basic concept of a hurricane season began during 1935, when dedicated wire circuits known as hurricane circuits began to be set up along the Gulf and Atlantic coasts, a process completed by 1955. It was originally the time frame when the tropics were monitored routinely for tropical cyclone activity, and was originally defined as from June 15 through October 31. Over the years, the beginning date was shifted back to June 1, while the end date was shifted to November 15, before settling at November 30 by 1965. This was when hurricane reconnaissance planes were sent out to fly across the Atlantic and Gulf of Mexico on a routine basis to look for potential tropical cyclones, in the years prior to the continuous weather satellite era. After regular satellite surveillance began, hurricane hunter aircraft flew only into areas which were spotted first by satellite imagery. Starting in 1958, a cooperative hurricane reporting network composed of over 100 unpaid observers would send observations in real-time during the hurricane season to their local Weather Bureau offices. The spacing of the network was roughly 40 kilometres (25 mi) between sites, and the locations would report wind speed, wind direction, rainfall, and pressure.

== National Hurricane Research Project ==
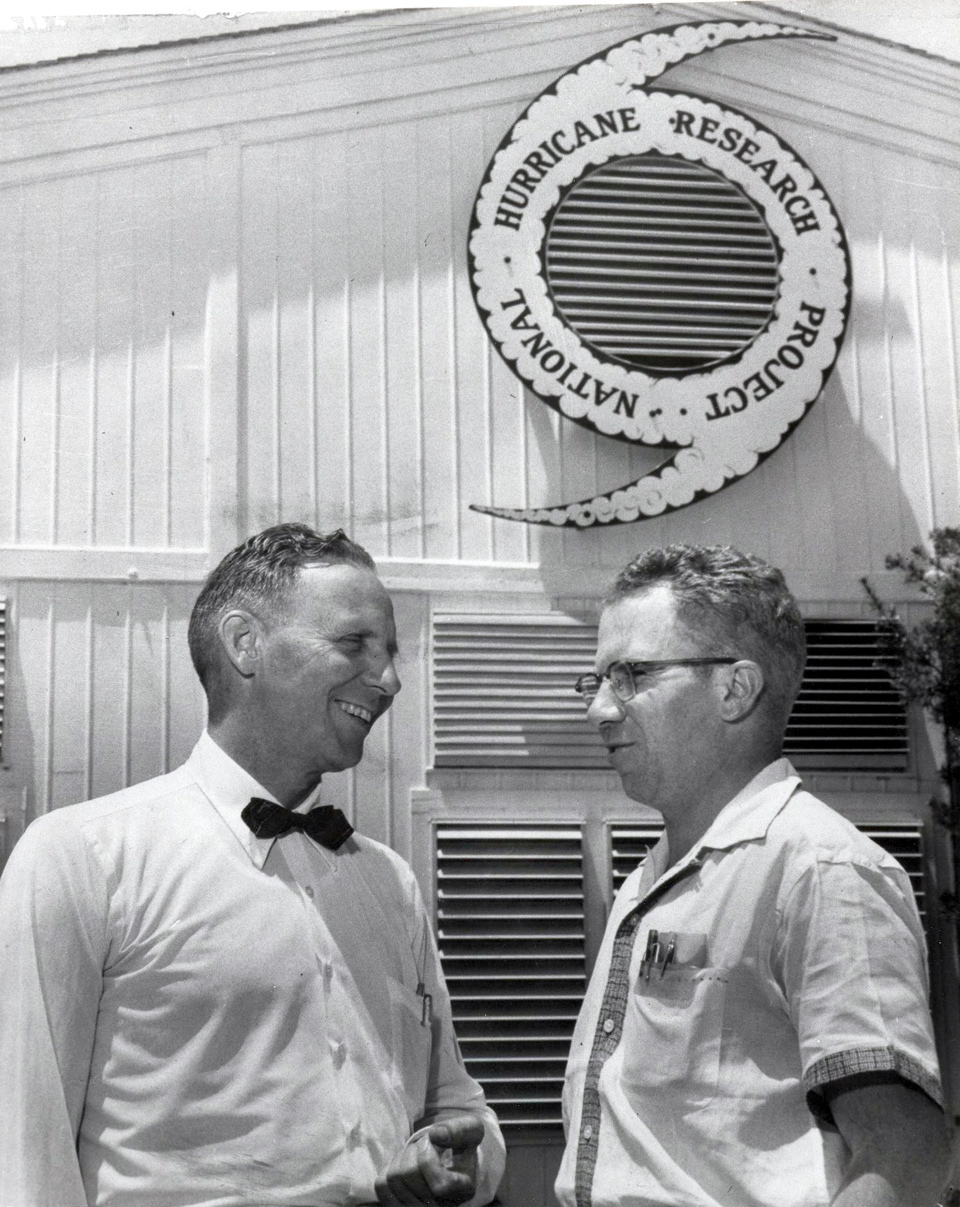
NHRP opening day

The National Hurricane Research Project (NHRP) was initiated in 1955 by the United States Weather Bureau in response to the devastating 1954 hurricane season, which significantly impacted the Mid-Atlantic states and New England. Robert Simpson, a Weather Bureau meteorologist who had participated in Air Force hurricane reconnaissance flights as an observer, was appointed as the first director of NHRP and organized the Research Operations Base at Morrison Air Force Base (now Palm Beach International Airport) in West Palm Beach, Florida in 1956. During the first three years of the Project, scientists used three specially instrumented Air Force Hurricane Hunters aircraft with crews on bailment from the 55th Weather Reconnaissance Squadron, collecting data that delineated the structure and energy budget of hurricanes for the first time.

In 1959, the Project was moved to Miami and collocated with the Miami hurricane forecast office. The Department of Commerce leased two DC-6 aircraft and received a B-57 jet from the Air Force so that NHRP could continue to carry out airborne experiments on hurricanes. The combination of the research project, forecast center, and aircraft facility was dubbed the "National Hurricane Center" (NHC). During the 1960s, while NHRP continued to carry out research flights, the Project also began to create computer models of hurricane circulation, formulated a statistical track program (NHC-64), wrote a manual on hurricane forecasting, and evaluated the accuracy of track forecasts. Starting with Hurricane Esther (1961), NHRP was heavily involved with Project Stormfury, the U. S. Government's experiment in hurricane modification. Late in 1964, the Project was renamed the National Hurricane Research Laboratory in recognition of it becoming a permanent institution within the Weather Bureau. This presaged the creation of the Environmental Research Laboratories the next year.

== National Hurricane Center ==
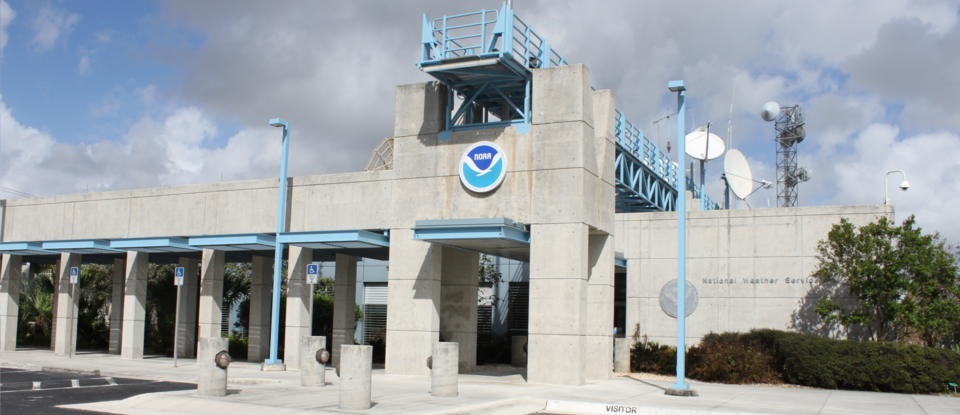
Front view of the National Hurricane Center

On July 1, 1956, a National Hurricane Information Center had become established in Miami, Florida which became a warehouse for all hurricane-related information from one office. The Miami Hurricane Warning Office (HWO) was moved from Lindsey Hopkins Hotel to the Aviation Building 4 miles (6.4 km) to the northwest on July 1, 1958. Forecasts for tropical cyclone movement were extended to two days in advance (at one day intervals) in 1961. The Miami HWO moved to the campus of the University of Miami in 1964, which is when tropical cyclone forecasts were extended to three days into the future, at one day intervals. The Miami HWO tropical cyclone reports were done regularly and took on their modern format in 1964. In 1970, NHC began analyzing tropical cyclone initial positions in real-time and added a 12‑hour forecast. Beginning in 1973, a portion of the National Meteorological Center (later renamed the Weather Prediction Center) gained advisory responsibility for dissipating inland tropical depressions. The World Meteorological Organization assumed control of the Atlantic hurricane naming list in 1977.

In 1978, the NHC's offices moved off campus to the IRE Financial Building. The hurricane warning offices remained active past 1983. Organizationally, the NHC left the aegis of the National Weather Service State Forecast Office in Miami in 1984, leaving the Southern Region and becoming its own national center, one of three in existence at that time. In 1988, NHC added a 36-hour point to their forecast. During the National Weather Service reorganization in the 1990s, the NHC was renamed the Tropical Prediction Center on October 1, 1995, and moved into a building on the campus of Florida International University. The Hurricane Specialists were grouped as a separate NHC unit under the Tropical Prediction Center, separating themselves from the Tropical Analysis and Forecast Branch. By 2001, tropical cyclone forecasts were extended from three to five days in advance, including forecast points for 96 and 120 hours. On October 1, 2010, the Tropical Prediction Center was renamed the NHC, and the group formerly known as the NHC became known as the Hurricane Specialists Unit (HSU).

== Tropical cyclone forecasting ==
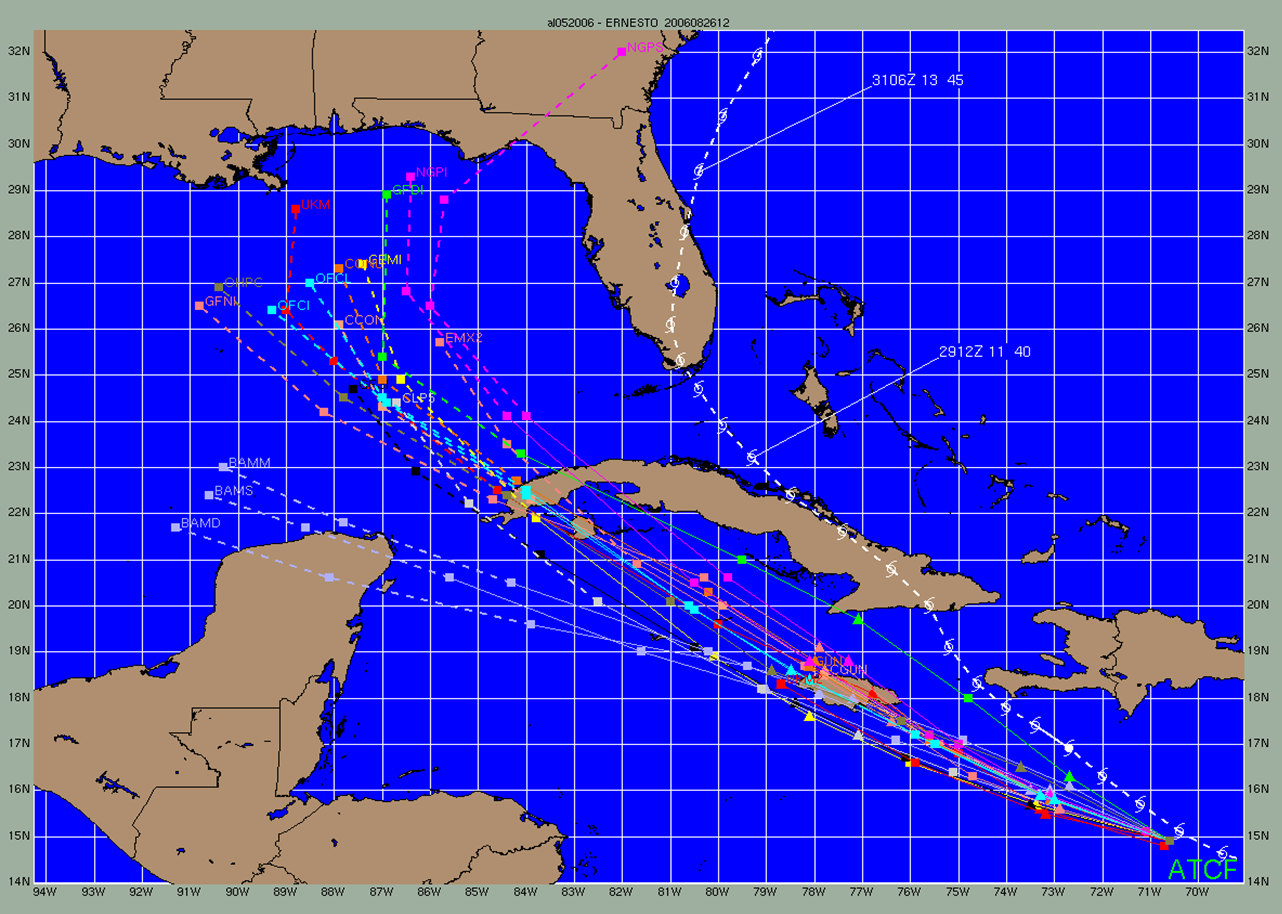
Significant track errors still occur on occasion, as seen in this early forecast of Hurricane Ernesto in 2006. The NHC official forecast is light blue, while the storm's actual track is the white line over Florida.

Tropical cyclone forecasting relies on data provided by numerical weather models. Three main classes of tropical cyclone guidance models exist: statistical models are based on an analysis of storm behavior using climatology and correlate a storm's position and date to produce a forecast that is not based on the physics of the atmosphere at the time. Dynamical models are numerical models that solve the governing equations of fluid flow in the atmosphere; they are based on the same principles as other limited-area numerical weather prediction models but may include special computational techniques such as refined spatial domains that move along with the cyclone. Models that use elements of both approaches are called statistical-dynamical models.

In 1978, the first hurricane-tracking model based on atmospheric dynamics—the movable fine-mesh (MFM) model—began operating. Within the field of tropical cyclone track forecasting, despite the ever-improving dynamical model guidance which occurred with increased computational power, it was not until the 1980s when numerical weather prediction showed skill, and until the 1990s when it consistently outperformed statistical or simple dynamical models. Predictions of the intensity of a tropical cyclone based on numerical weather prediction continue to be a challenge, since statistical methods continue to show higher skill over dynamical guidance.

== Advisory, watch, and warning evolution ==
Tropical storm warning flag used in the United States

The timing and naming of tropical cyclone advisories, watches, and warnings have changed over time. In 1958, tropical cyclone advisories were issued every six hours starting at 04:00 UTC each day. During 1967, hurricane watches were used to designate areas where hurricane conditions were possible in the next 24 hours, while hurricane warnings indicated areas where the hurricane center should cross the coast. Small craft, gale, and storm warnings were issued for hurricanes not expected to make landfall. By 1987, the definition of tropical cyclone watches had changed to areas where gale or hurricane-force winds were possible within 36 hours, with warnings issued when gale or hurricane-force winds were expected within 24 hours. In 1987, gale watches/warnings were renamed tropical storm watches/warnings. In 1991, advisory timing shifted back to every six hours starting at 03:30 UTC every day. In 1992, advisory timing changed to every six hours starting at 03:00 UTC each day. The length of time used for watches and warnings changed again in 2010, with watches using a 48‑hour time frame and warnings using a 36-hour time frame.

Within the United States, a separate set of inland tropical cyclone warnings was issued by National Weather Service forecast offices, based upon the latest NHC advisory, during the decade of the 2000s. These warnings used the word "Wind" inserted before the "Watch" or "Warning", which was dropped for 2005. Previously, standard High Wind Warnings and Watches were issued (which denote ≥39 MPH winds or ≥58 mph gusts). When they were inland, watches and warnings were posted for a tropical storm or hurricane-force winds expected during the next 24 and 12 hours, respectively.

== Current operations ==
During the hurricane season, the National Hurricane Center routinely issues its Tropical Weather Outlook product, which identifies areas of concern within the tropics that could develop into tropical cyclones. If systems occur outside the defined hurricane season, special Tropical Weather Outlooks will be issued. While a tropical cyclone is active, six-hourly advisories will be issued, which become more frequent when a tropical cyclone watch or warning is issued. Tropical cyclone watches and warnings are coordinated within the countries and dependencies involved, with the National Hurricane Center coordinating with National Weather Service Forecast Offices concerning storms threatening the United States and its dependencies. Routine coordination occurs at 1700 UTC each day between the Weather Prediction Center and National Hurricane Center to identify systems for the pressure maps three to seven days into the future within the tropics, and points for existing tropical cyclones six to seven days into the future.
