= 1870 Atlantic hurricane season =

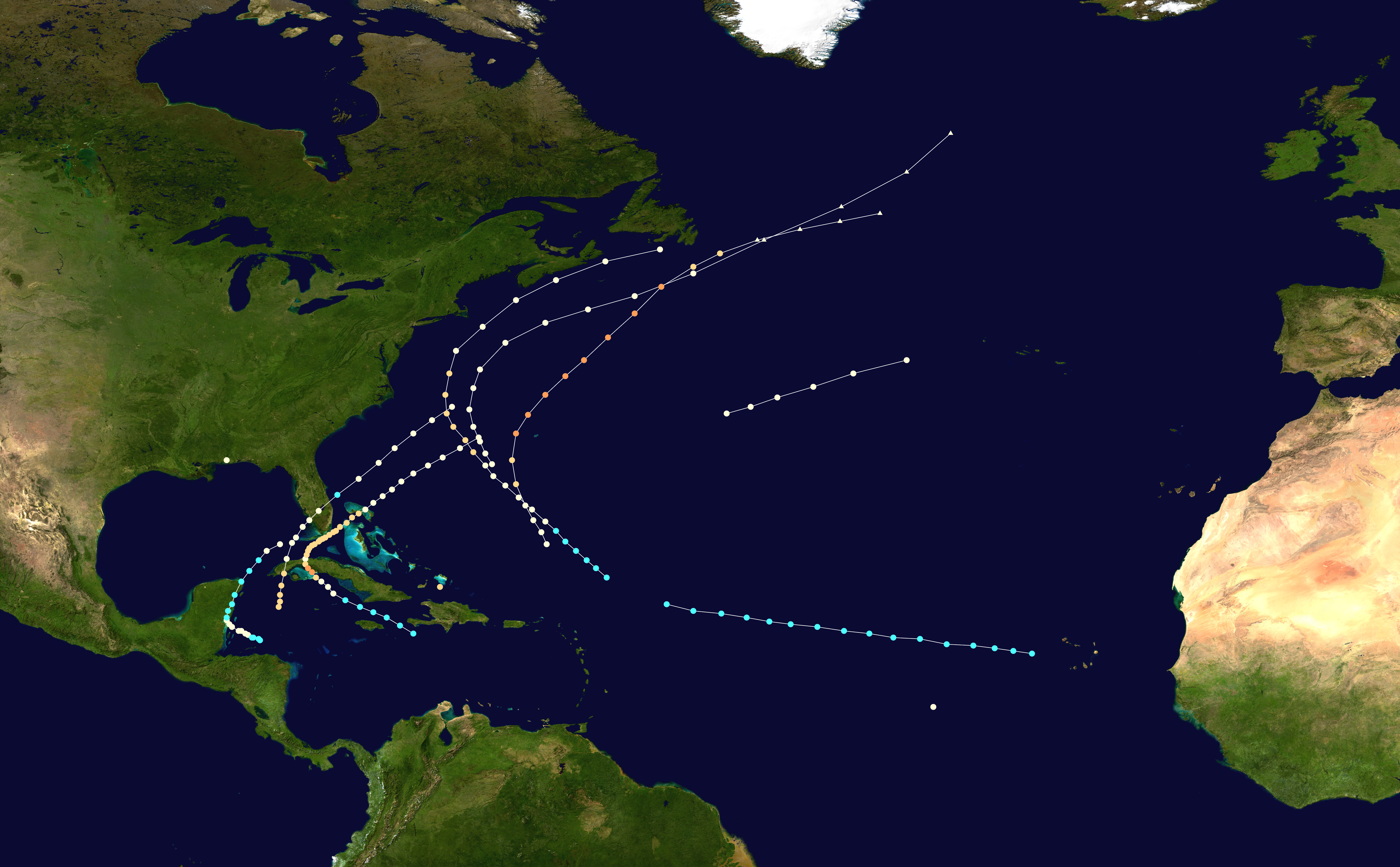
- Season summary map

Seasonal boundaries
- First system formed: July 30, 1870
- Last system dissipated: November 3, 1870

Strongest storm
- Name: Four
  - Maximum winds: 125 mph (205 km/h) (1-minute sustained)
  - Lowest pressure: 948 mbar (hPa; 27.99 inHg)

Seasonal statistics
- Total storms: 11
- Hurricanes: 10
- Major hurricanes (Cat. 3+): 2
- Total fatalities: At least 895
- Total damage: > $17.25 million (1870 USD)

The 1870 Atlantic hurricane season marked the beginning of Father Benito Viñes investigating tropical cyclones, inspired by two hurricanes that devastated Cuba that year; Viñes consequently became a pioneer in studying and forecasting such storms. The season featured 11 known tropical cyclones, 10 of which became a hurricane, while 2 of those intensified into major hurricanes. (Note: A major hurricane is a storm that ranks as Category 3 or higher on the Saffir–Simpson hurricane wind scale.) However, in the absence of modern satellite and other remote-sensing technologies, only storms that affected populated land areas or encountered ships at sea were recorded, so the actual total could be higher. An undercount bias of zero to six tropical cyclones per year between 1851 and 1885 and zero to four per year between 1886 and 1910 has been estimated.

Reanalysis by meteorologists José Fernández-Partagás and Henry F. Diaz in 1995 led to the inclusion of seven previously undocumented Atlantic tropical cyclones – the second, third, fifth, seventh, eighth, tenth, and eleventh storms. However, Atlantic hurricane reanalysis project did not add any new systems during their review of the 1870 season in 2011. Little information is available on many of these storms, including three in which their tracks consist of merely a single data point in HURDAT. Climate researcher Michael Chenoweth conducted another reanalysis, published in 2014, which adds a net of three storms, with the tracks of four storms combined into two and five new storms proposed. However, Chenoweth's reanalysis has yet to be added to HURDAT.

The first known storm was reported near Mobile, Alabama, on July 30 and caused about $250,000 (1870 USD) in damage. (Note: All damage figures are in 1870 USD, unless otherwise noted) Nearly a month later, the next system existed over the western Atlantic Ocean and produced severe impacts in Nova Scotia. Two other storms left significant effects on land, both in Cuba and Florida in October. The first of these, the sixth known system of the season, particularly devastated modern-day Matanzas Province, causing at least 800 deaths, approximately $12 million in damage, and the destruction of hundreds, if not thousands, of dwellings. Later, another cyclone, the season's ninth, wrought substantial impacts to western Cuba, killed 43 people and leaving about $5 million in damage. While in the vicinity of Florida, the hurricane also capsized a ship near the Jupiter Inlet, leading to 52 fatalities. Overall, the tropical cyclones of the 1870 season caused more than $17.25 million in damage and at least 895 deaths.

== Season summary ==
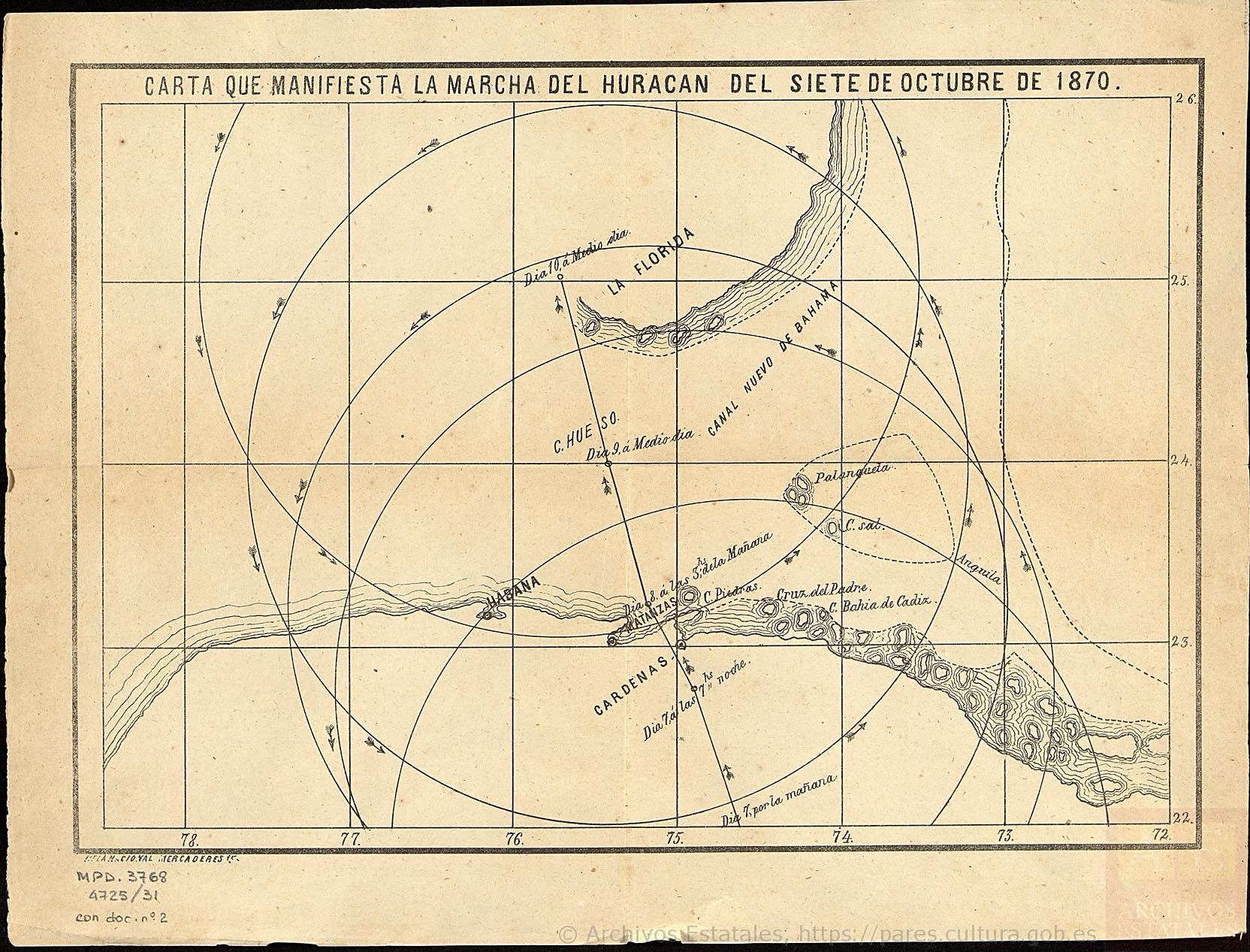
Map showing the progress of Hurricane Six

The Atlantic hurricane database (HURDAT) recognizes 11 tropical cyclones for the 1870 season, 10 of which attained hurricane status. Two of those hurricanes are believed to have intensified into a major hurricane – Category 3 or stronger on the modern-day Saffir–Simpson scale. The first storm of the season was observed along coastal Alabama on July 30, but little else is known about the system's progress. HURDAT begins the track of the next cyclone a month later, on August 30. Later in its duration, the storm moved parallel to Nova Scotia before being last noted near Newfoundland on September 4. Three other storms developed in September; the fourth system peaked with maximum sustained winds of 125 mph (205 km/h) and a minimum barometric pressure of 948 mbar (28.0 inHg), becoming the most intense tropical cyclone of the season. October became the most active month of the season, with six known storms forming. The last of these, the eleventh storm of 1870, was last encountered by ships in the southeastern Gulf of Mexico on November 3.

Collectively, the cyclones of the 1870 season caused at least 895 fatalities and more than $17.25 million in damage, the vast majority due to the sixth storm. However, The Times lists the sixth storm's death toll as high as 2000. Further, other sources estimate that the combined damage total in Cuba for the sixth and ninth storms reached as much as $27 million. Newspapers also reported that the two hurricanes damaged about one-fourth of Cuba's sugar crop, while "the fruit of the island is half destroyed." Captain General Antonio Caballero y Fernández de Rodas ordered that the Spanish government expend $500,000 in aid for both storms combined.

Father Benito Viñes, a Spanish Jesuit priest, became the director of the meteorological observatory at the Colegio de Belén in Havana, Cuba, in 1870. Following two storms that devastated the country in October of that year, Viñes began studying those hurricanes and previous systems – including their circulations, organization, and movements – becoming a pioneer in tropical cyclone forecasting. Later, Viñes issued possibly the first-ever hurricane warning in 1875 and founded a network of weather stations across the Caribbean Sea in 1876 to improve his forecasts.

The season's activity was reflected with an accumulated cyclone energy (ACE) rating of 88, which was then the highest total since records began in 1851, but has since been tied or surpassed numerous times. ACE is a metric used to express the energy used by a tropical cyclone during its lifetime. Therefore, a storm with a longer duration will have higher values of ACE. It is only calculated at six-hour increments in which specific tropical and subtropical systems are either at or above sustained wind speeds of 39 mph (63 km/h), which is the threshold for tropical storm intensity. Thus, tropical depressions are not included here.

== Systems ==
=== Hurricane One ===
- Category 1 hurricane (SSHWS)
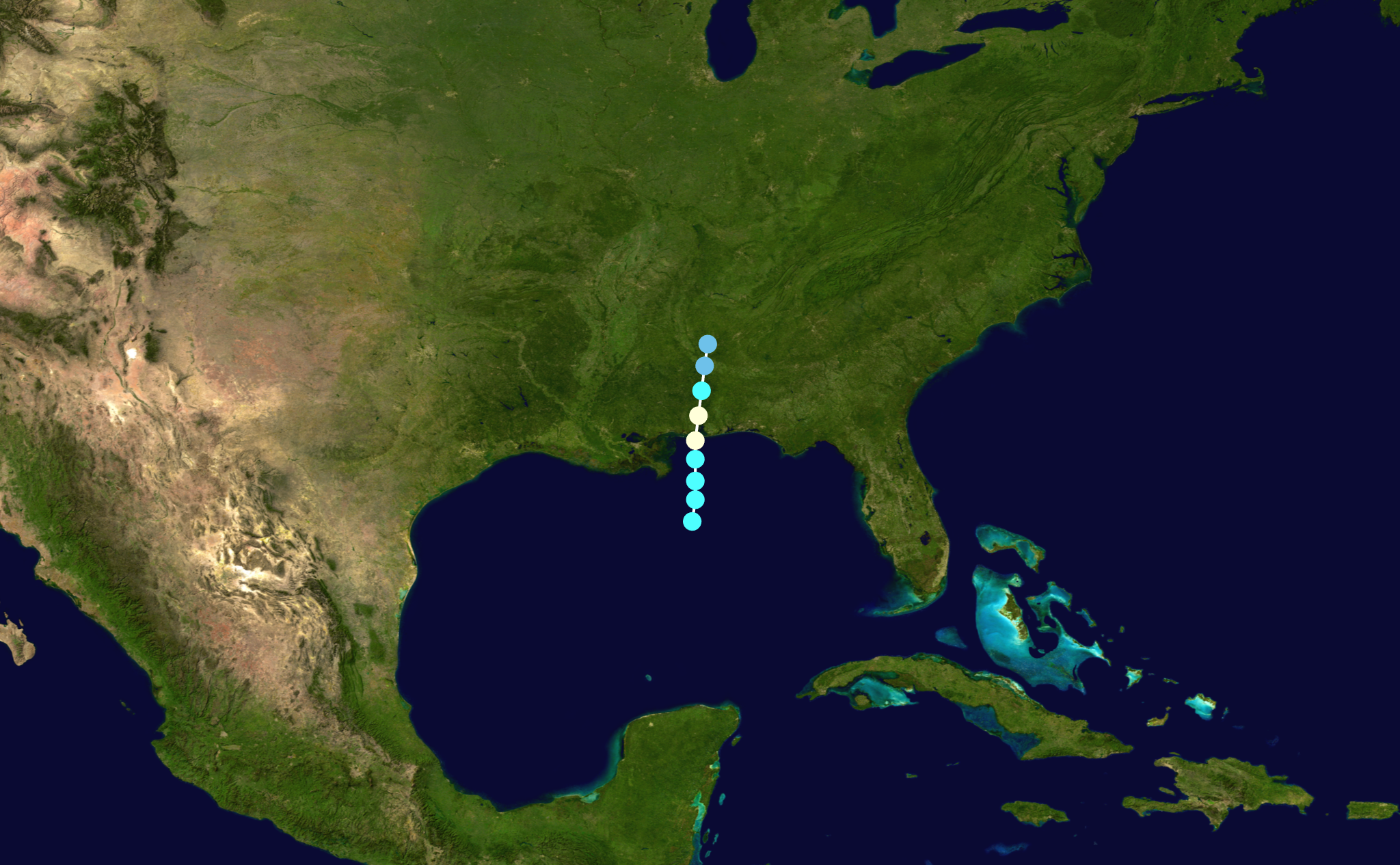
- Duration: July 30 – July 30
- Peak intensity: 80 mph (130 km/h) (1-min); 985 mbar (hPa)

The Mobile Hurricane of 1870

The first officially recognized tropical cyclone of 1870 made landfall near Mobile, Alabama, on July 30, though little is known about its genesis or track. According to one report, barometric pressure fell to 931 mbar (27.5 inHg), but this is considered dubious. The storm's passage was brief, with the strongest winds confined to a period of about two hours in the early afternoon. Storm surge flooding damaged coastal installations along the shores of Mobile Bay, and several steamboats were either sunk or blown ashore. The winds uprooted trees, damaged roofs, and severed telegraph wires throughout Mobile. At the height of the storm, a floating dry dock broke free from its moorings and traveled about 8 mi (13 km) up the Mobile River, crushing wharves and boats along its path. Overall, damage from the storm amounted to an estimated $250,000.

Reanalysis by climate researcher Michael Chenoweth, published in 2014, extended the track of this system back to July 29 as a tropical storm over the north-central Gulf of Mexico. Chenoweth also theorizes that the hurricane dissipated near Tuscaloosa, Alabama, on July 31.

=== Hurricane Two ===
- Category 2 hurricane (SSHWS)
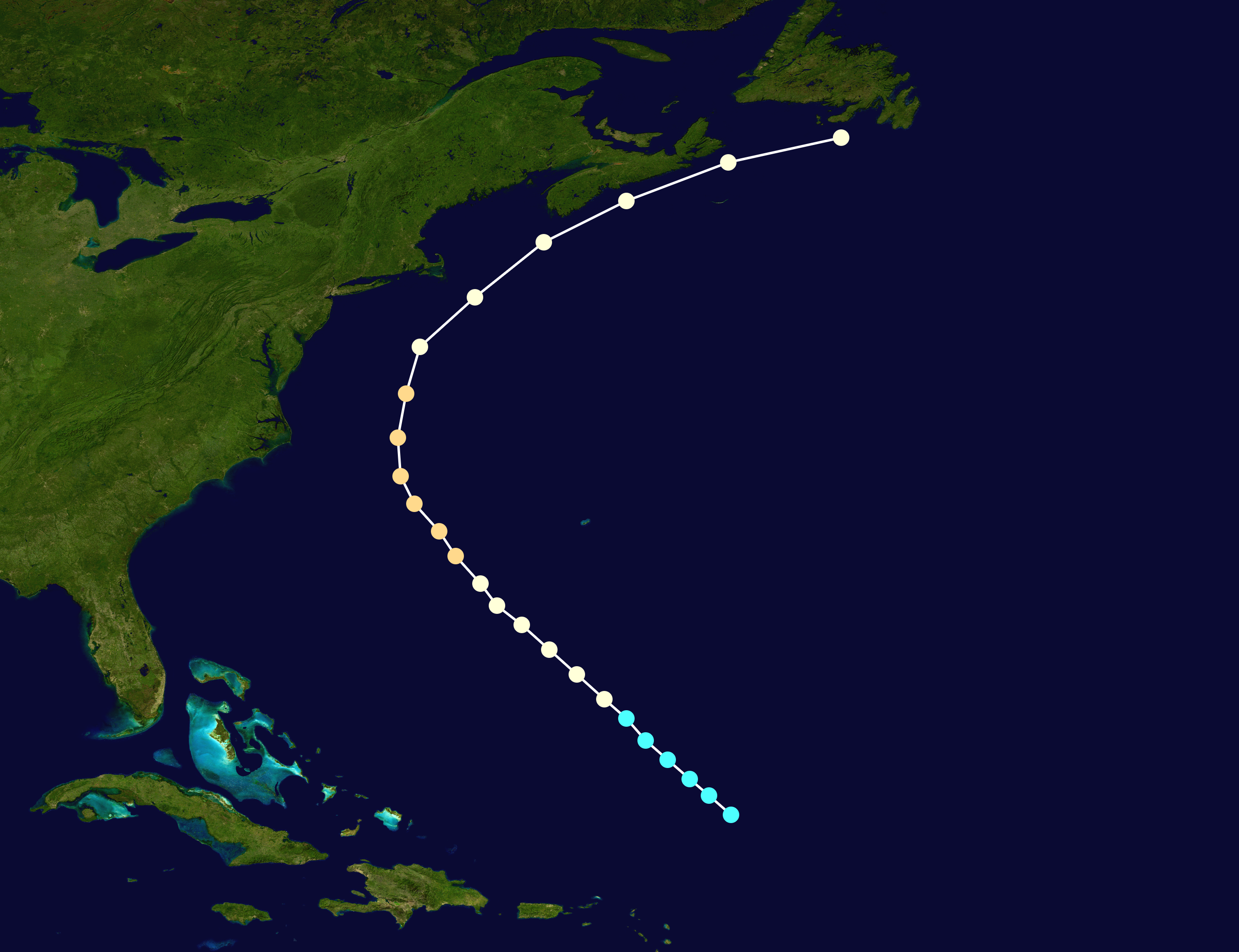
- Duration: August 30 – September 4
- Peak intensity: 105 mph (165 km/h) (1-min);

Although the ship Daniel Marcy likely encountered this storm as early as August 22, the vessel's crew did not record their location. Thus, the official track for this system begins as a tropical storm about 320 mi (510 km) northeast of the Lesser Antilles on August 30, the same day the R.M.S. Shannon encountered it. The storm moved northwest towards the East Coast of the United States and intensified into a hurricane on the following day. Early on September 2, the cyclone reached sustained winds of 105 mph (165 km/h), equivalent to a Category 2 hurricane on the modern-day Saffir–Simpson scale. However, the hurricane curved north-northeastward and then northeastward on September 3, remaining offshore. It then travelled parallel to the coast of Nova Scotia until it was last seen on September 4 near Newfoundland.

The coast of Maine experienced abnormally high tides, prompting vessels to seek refuge at a safe harbor. Nova Scotia reported severe impacts, especially along its south coast. At the Halifax neighborhood of South End, a group of 16 to 18 vessels became "entirely broken to pieces beyond the possibility of repair." with a few exceptions, according to the North British Daily Mail. Strong winds led to the streets being littered with bricks, shingles, and slates, while the storm toppled many large trees and fences in the Spring Garden section of Halifax. A carriage factory was nearly destroyed, suffering about $4,000 in damage. The storm demolished many barns at the North West Arm and destroyed a building in Dartmouth. Significant damage was inflicted to trees and plants at the Nova Scotia Horticultural Society Garden. Additionally, the Portland Daily Press reported that the hurricane "destroy[ed] a large amount of marine property and life".

Chenoweth's 2014 study begins the track of this storm on August 25 as a tropical storm east of the Lesser Antilles. The study also indicates that the cyclone struck Nova Scotia on September 4 and Newfoundland later that day after crossing the Gulf of St. Lawrence.

=== Tropical Storm Three ===
- Tropical storm (SSHWS)
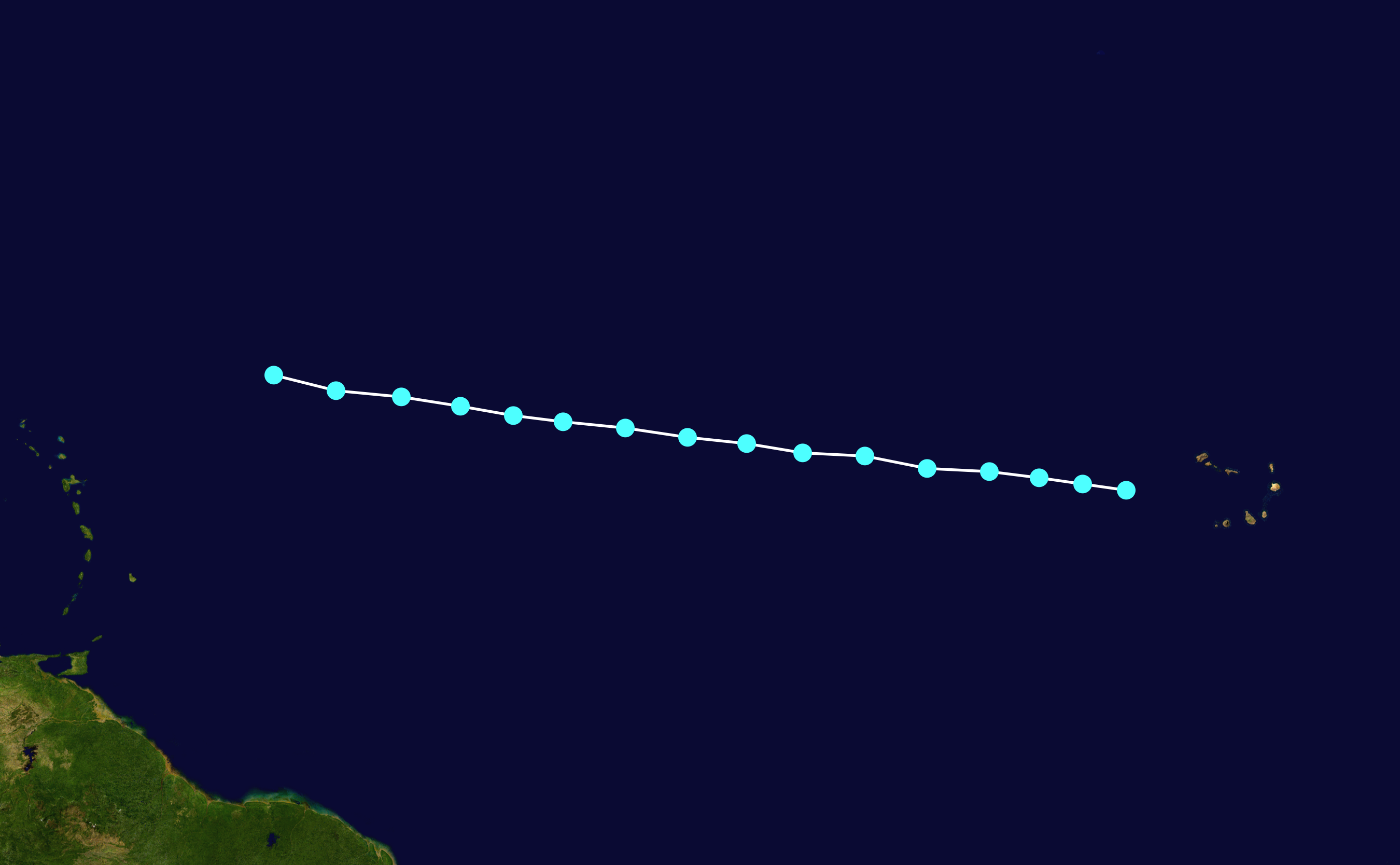
- Duration: September 1 – September 4
- Peak intensity: 70 mph (110 km/h) (1-min); 1004 mbar (hPa)

A tropical storm was detected to the west of Cabo Verde Islands on September 1. Tracking westward, it was encountered by another ship on September 4. The storm's subsequent progress is unknown. Chenoweth extended the track of this system back to August 29 and combined it with the subsequent storm, while also postulating that the cyclone reached hurricane intensity on August 30.

=== Hurricane Four ===
- Category 3 hurricane (SSHWS)
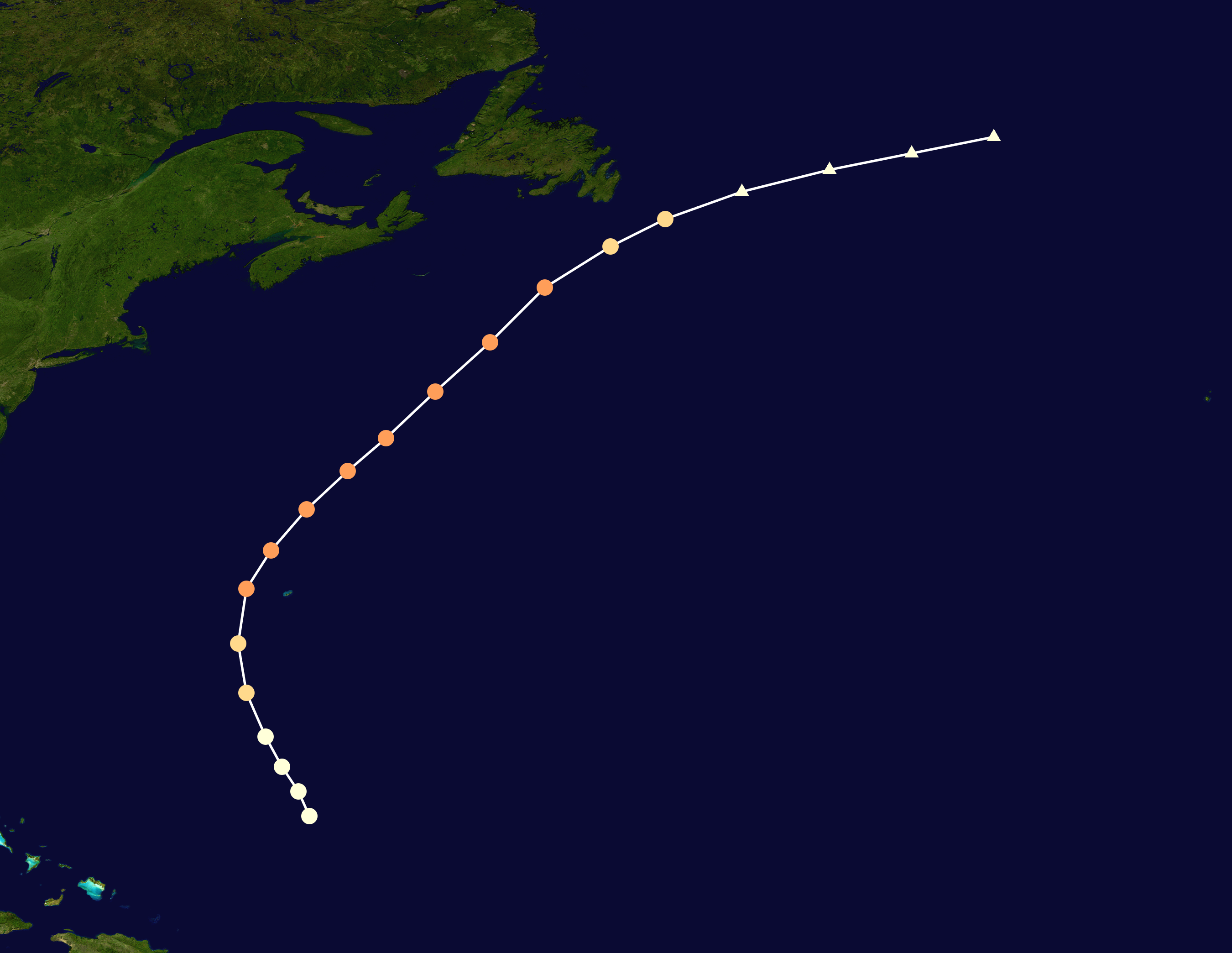
- Duration: September 9 – September 12
- Peak intensity: 125 mph (205 km/h) (1-min); 948 mbar (hPa)

This hurricane was first encountered by a ship about 260 mi (420 km) northeast of San Juan, Puerto Rico, on September 9. The storm tracked generally northward, and on September 10, it passed 90 mi (145 km) west of Bermuda. There, the storm produced tropical storm-force winds that extensively damaged banana and other fruit trees. Based on a central barometric pressure reading of 948 mbar (28.0 inHg) from the brig Lizzie M. Morrell, the storm is believed to have achieved major hurricane intensity. Curving northeastward, the hurricane underwent extratropical transition by September 13. Chenoweth considers this storm and the previous to have been the same cyclone.

=== Hurricane Five ===
- Category 1 hurricane (SSHWS)
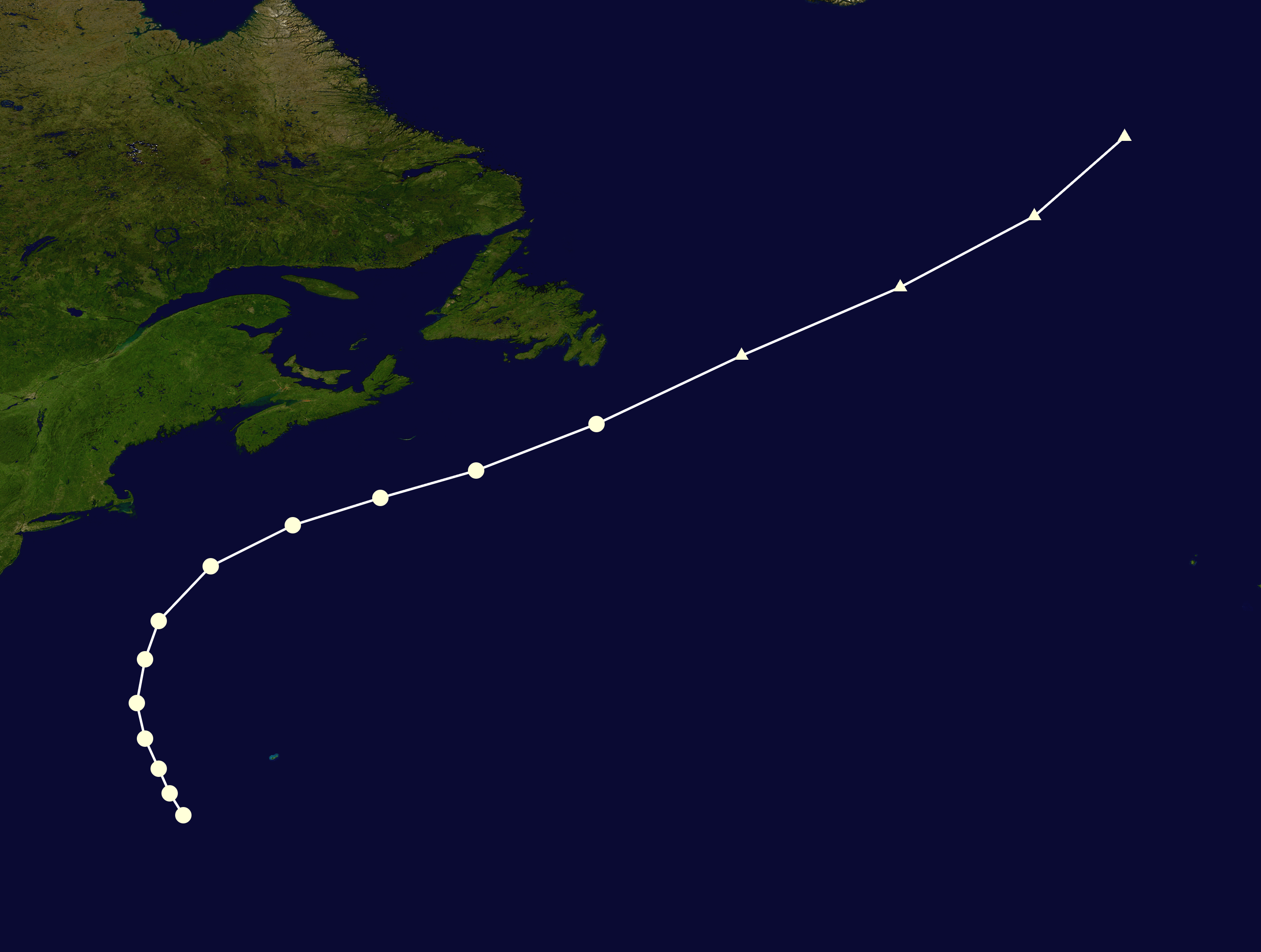
- Duration: September 17 – September 19
- Peak intensity: 90 mph (150 km/h) (1-min); 969 mbar (hPa)

Numerous ships in the western Atlantic reported stormy weather from September 17 through September 20. Consequently, the track for this storm begins on the former date about 240 mi (385 km) southwest of Bermuda, as a hurricane with winds of 90 mph (150 km/h). By weighting these reports according to their credibility and consistency, Fernández-Partagás constructed an approximate recurving track for the hurricane. Early on September 19, the brig Eolus recorded a barometric pressure of 969 mbar (28.6 inHg), the lowest in relation to the storm. As the system accelerated northeastward, it probably transitioned into an extratropical cyclone late on September 19 about 230 mi (370 km) east of Newfoundland.

Chenoweth estimates that this storm formed on September 9 as a tropical storm about halfway between the Lesser Antilles and the Cabo Verde Islands. The storm then moved northwestward and reached hurricane status by September 11. Additionally, Chenoweth theorized that the extratropical transition occurred on September 20.

=== Hurricane Six ===
- Category 3 hurricane (SSHWS)
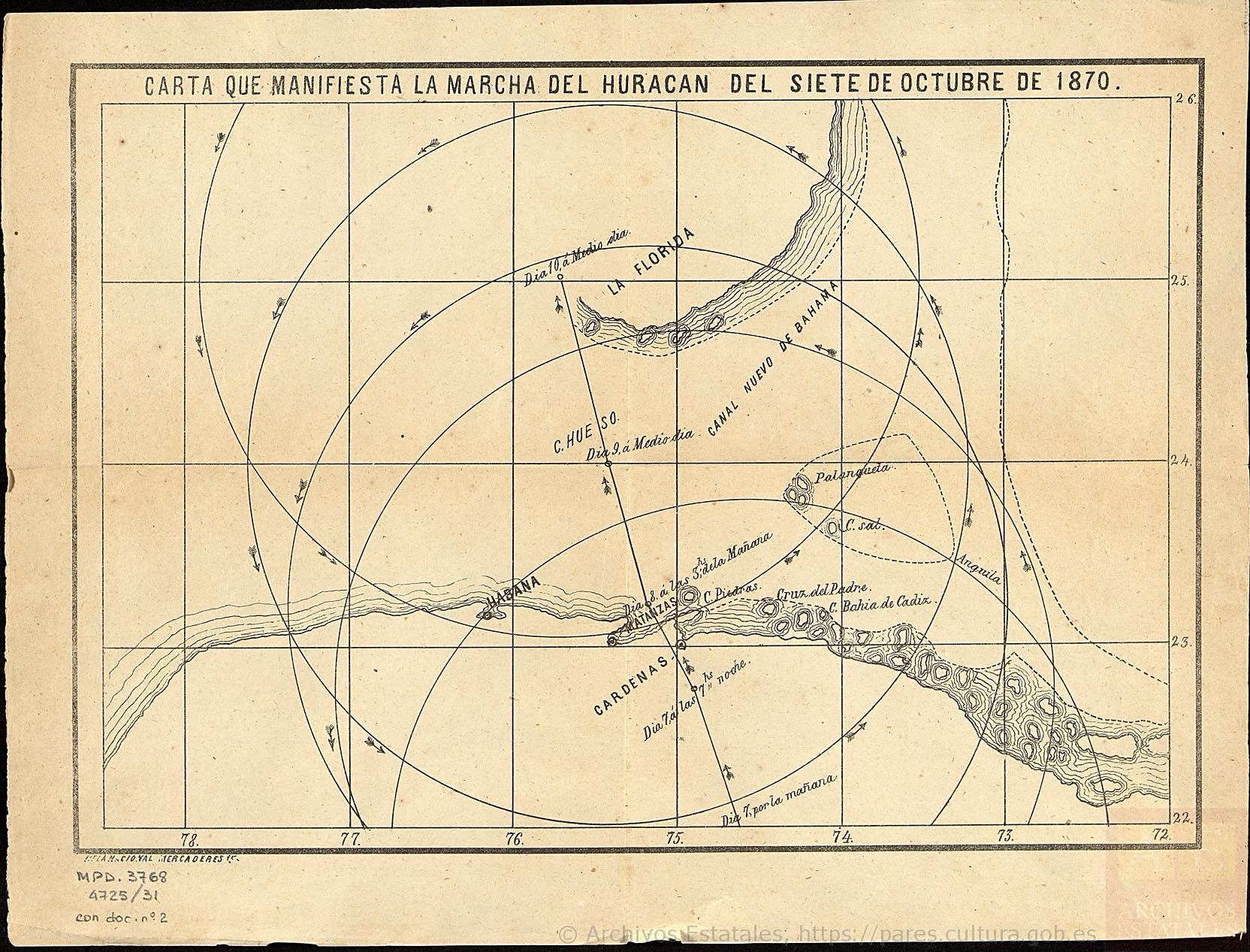
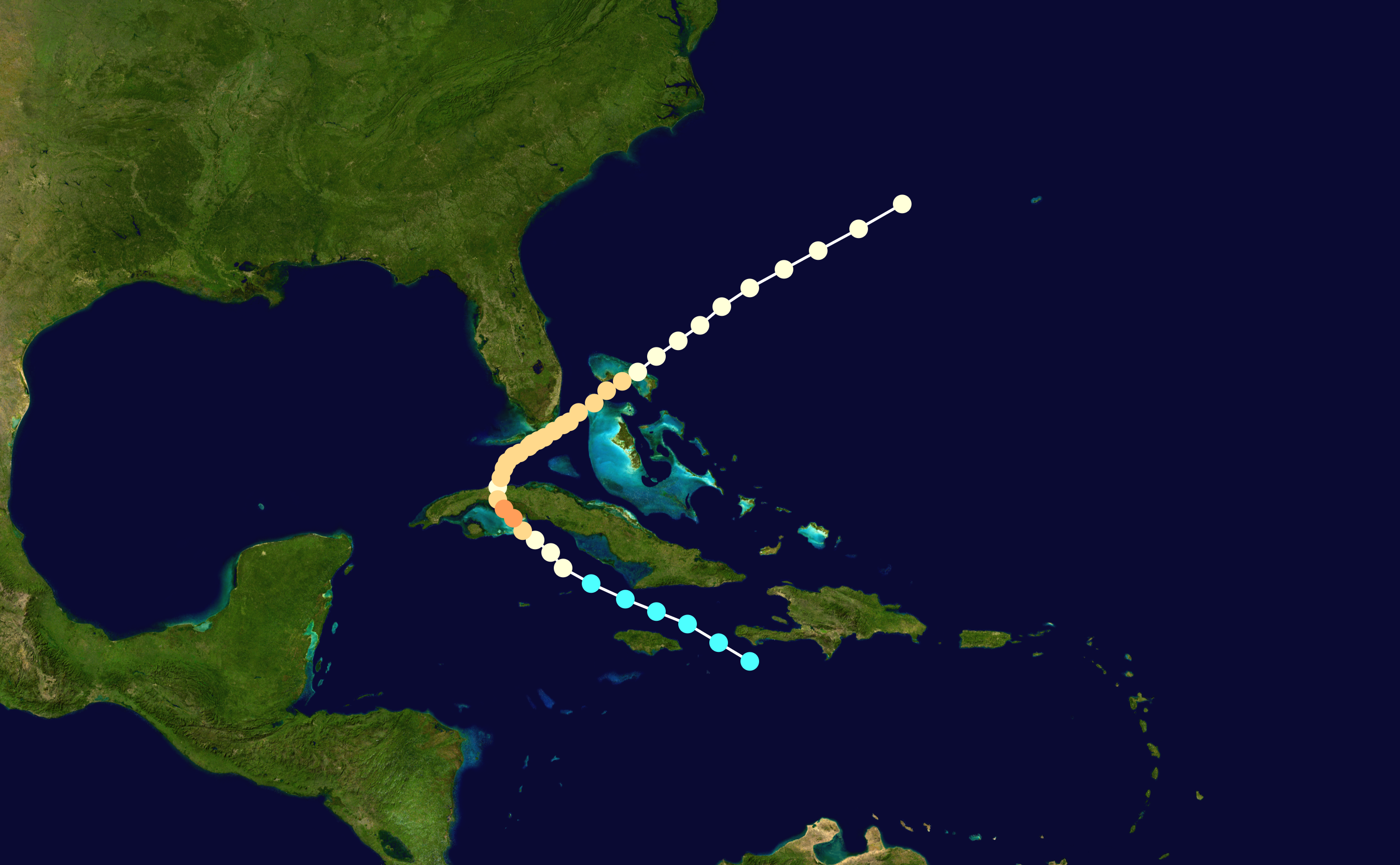
- Duration: October 5 – October 14
- Peak intensity: 115 mph (185 km/h) (1-min); 959 mbar (hPa)

Based on reports from contemporary Cuban meteorologists, a tropical storm was first observed in the Caribbean just south of Haiti's Tiburon Peninsula on October 5. The storm moved west-northwestward and intensified into a hurricane south of Cuba on the following day. Thereafter, the cyclone rapidly strengthened further and likely peaked as a Category 3 hurricane with maximum sustained winds of 115 mph (185 km/h) prior to making landfall in the Ciénaga de Zapata municipality of Cuba's Matanzas Province on October 7. After crossing Cuba, the hurricane moved slowly northeastward through the Straits of Florida, tracking close to the Florida Keys as a Category 2 hurricane for a few days. The storm then struck Grand Bahama and the Abaco Islands in the Bahamas early on October 12 while still a Category 2 hurricane, but soon weakened to Category 1 status. It moved out to sea, last being seen west of Bermuda on October 14.

In Cuba, the hurricane produced high winds and intensive rainfall. Two rivers, the San Juan and the Yumuri, burst their banks, devastating the city of Matanzas and causing the loss of some 800 lives. These impacts destroyed approximately 410 homes, with the Cuban Meteorological Society stating in 2000 that "this number probably refers only to the city [Matanzas]." Floodwaters swept away two bridges, a railroad station, and a train, along with its passengers. The nearby city of Cárdenas reported major damage to warehouses and wharves, as well as the destruction of several dwellings; many more lost their roofs or otherwise suffered damage. Throughout the country, a loss of roughly one-third of sugar crops occurred – approximately 300,000 to 400,000 boxes. At least 800 people died in Cuba, making it one of the deadliest Atlantic hurricanes on record. Damage was estimated at over $12 million (USD). In Florida, the lower parts of Key West became "one complete sheet of water", according to the Key West Dispatch, while tides swept away a few bridges. Significant damage to vegetation and trees also occurred. Numerous vessels wrecked throughout the Florida Keys and along or just offshore the mainland as far north as the Jupiter Inlet. In the Bahamas, Bimini reportedly began experiencing the storm as early as October 7. Abnormally high tides inundated South Bimini, leaving people "reduced to a state of starvation", according to The Nassau Guardian. The hurricane also capsized and dismasted a number of ships sailing in the vicinity of the Bahamas.

Chenoweth's 2014 study indicates that this storm remained well south of the Florida Keys and rapidly intensified over the Straits of Florida. On October 9, the cyclone briefly peaked as a Category 5 hurricane with winds of 160 mph (260 km/h), based on a peripheral atmospheric pressure of 914 mbar (27.0 inHg). If confirmed, this would represent the earliest recorded Category 5 Atlantic hurricane in HURDAT, surpassing the current record-holder, in 1924. However, the results of the study remain preliminary as of 2024. The hurricane continued northeastward through October 16, by which time it became extratropical east of Newfoundland.

=== Hurricane Seven ===
- Category 1 hurricane (SSHWS)
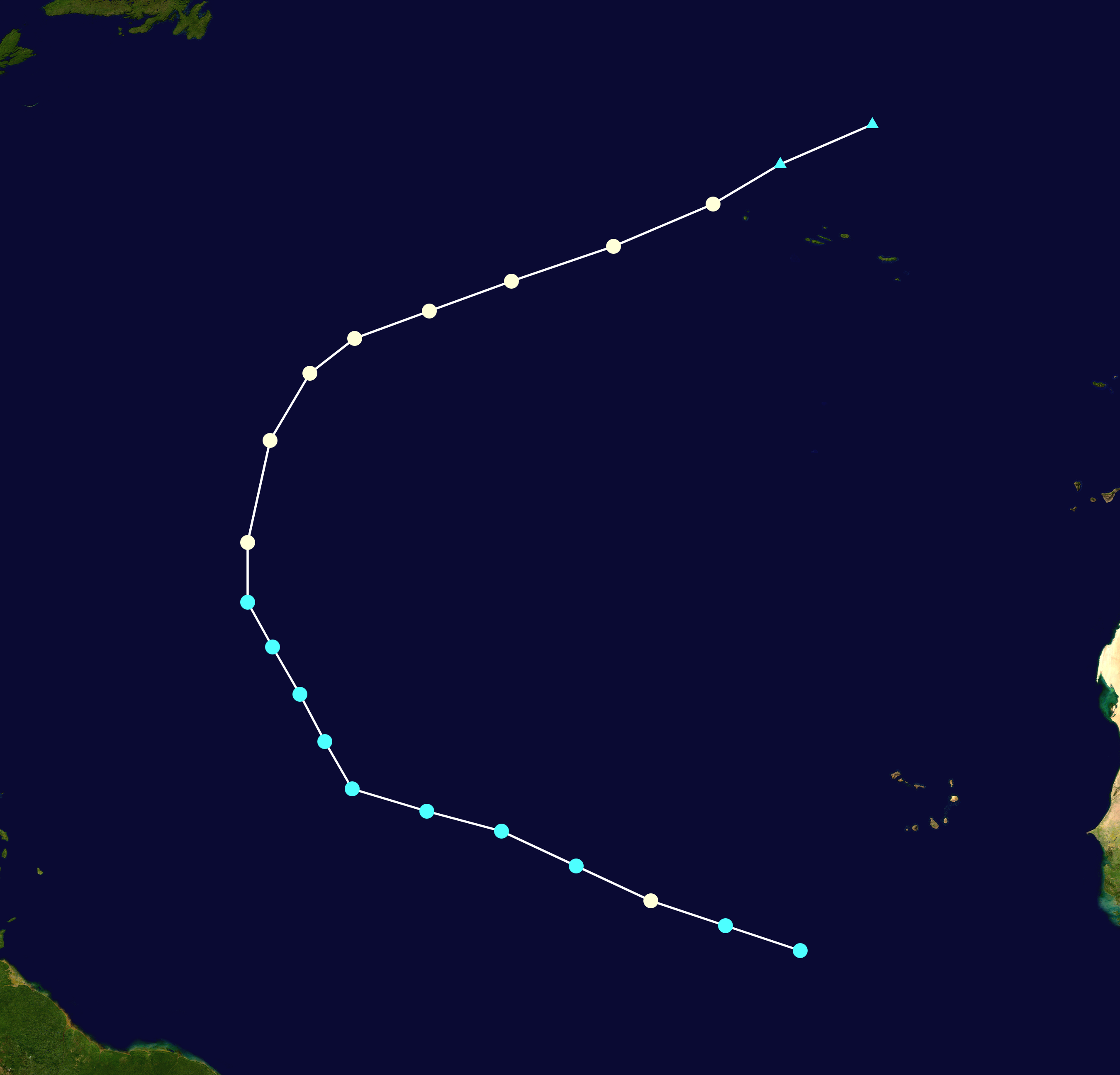
- Duration: October 7 – October 7
- Peak intensity: 80 mph (130 km/h) (1-min);

On October 7, a ship, the Horatio Harris, reported a hurricane several hundred miles west of the Cabo Verde Islands; this appears to be the only known record of the storm. Fernández-Partagás considered that the system may have been related to the subsequent tropical cyclone over the northern Atlantic, but determined this to be unlikely, given the rapid speed at which it would have needed to travel. Chenoweth opted to combine both systems. The 2014 study also proposed a much weaker cyclone on October 7, with the storm beginning then as a tropical depression, which intensified into a tropical storm that day and remained below hurricane status until October 9.

=== Hurricane Eight ===
- Category 1 hurricane (SSHWS)
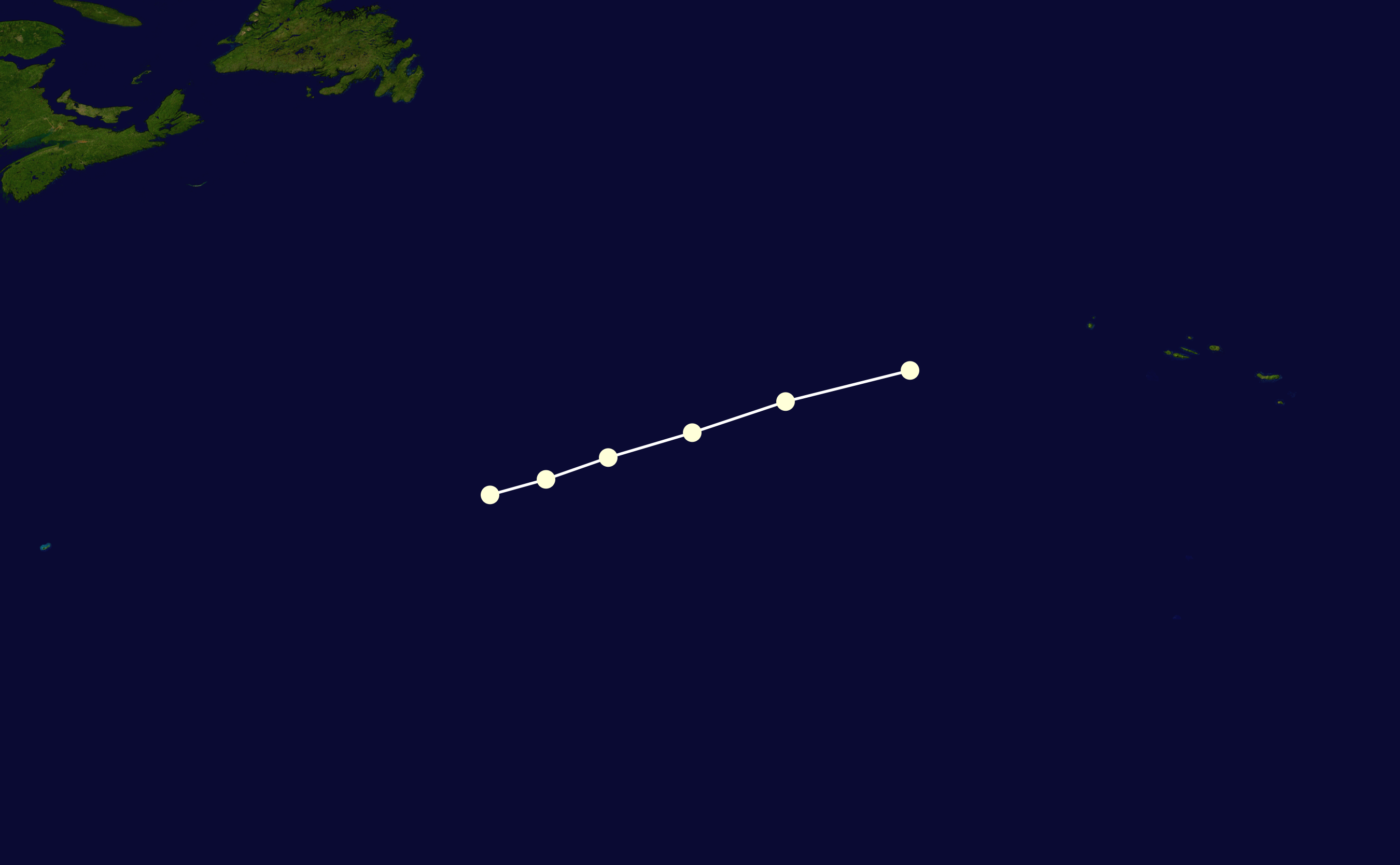
- Duration: October 10 – October 11
- Peak intensity: 80 mph (130 km/h) (1-min);

A hurricane was first detected on October 10, more than 800 mi (1,285 km) to the east of Bermuda. Based on reports from several ships, it headed east-northeastward over the following day. Little else is known about its track. Chenoweth opted to combine this storm and the previous. Additionally, he noted that the hurricane transitioned into an extratropical cyclone on October 11.

=== Hurricane Nine ===
- Category 2 hurricane (SSHWS)
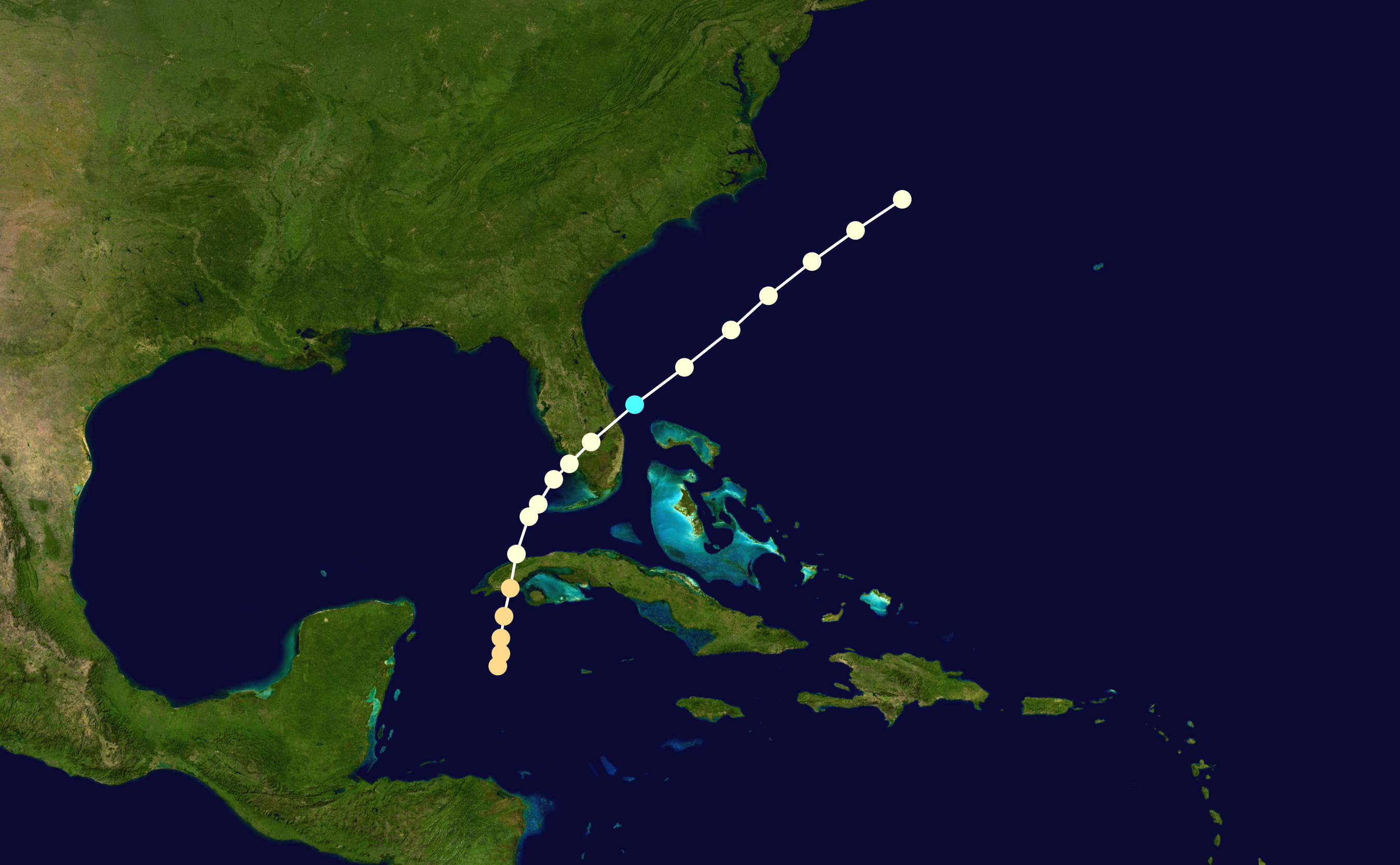
- Duration: October 19 – October 22
- Peak intensity: 105 mph (165 km/h) (1-min); 970 mbar (hPa)

Second Key West Hurricane of 1870

An assistant at the physical and meteorological observatory in Havana, Cuba, reported a wind shift on October 19, the same day that the bark Idaho began experiencing hurricane-like conditions over the northwestern Caribbean. Thus, the official track for this storm begins at 00:00 UTC on October 19 as a Category 2 hurricane with winds of 105 mph (165 km/h). Moving north-northeastward, the hurricane struck the south coast of Cuba's Pinar del Río Province near La Coloma about 24 hours later. Trekking across western Cuba for about six hours, the cyclone emerged into the southeastern Gulf of Mexico, likely as a Category 1 hurricane. Later on October 20, the center of the hurricane passed over the Dry Tortugas and then on the Florida mainland near Chokoloskee. The system emerged into the Atlantic near present-day Fort Pierce the following day and briefly weakened to a tropical storm. On October 22, the storm was last noted east of North Carolina by the bark Midas.

Parts of Pinar del Río and Havana provinces in Cuba suffered significant impacts. In the former, the region of Vuelta Abajo reported the destruction of some entire villages and to agricultural properties, with damage exceeding $1 million. The hurricane ruined virtually all banana crops in the region and also caused serious losses to sugarcane and tobacco crops. Communications and transportation to Vuelta Abajo were also disrupted. Storm surge in Batabanó, then located in Havana Province, flooded many homes with up to 4 ft (1.2 m) of water, demolishing about 40 residences. Approximately $5 million in damage occurred in Cuba, as well as 43 deaths. In Florida, Fort Jefferson experienced heavy rainfall and hurricane-force winds. A report from the fort noted that "trees and fences protested, buildings surroofed & debris flying in every direction". Six vessels capsized at Key West, while many ships wrecked along the Florida Reef and areas north of Cape Florida. The National Hurricane Center attributes 52 fatalities to the storm, all of which occurred after the SS Varuna sank offshore Florida's Jupiter Inlet on October 20,

Chenoweth theorized that this storm originated as a tropical depression east of the present-day Honduras–Nicaragua border (then known as the Mosquito Coast) on October 17. After the cyclone reached the Gulf of Mexico, the study shows the storm maintaining Category 3 intensity for several hours on October 20, including during its landfall on the Florida mainland. Chenoweth ends the track for this storm on the same day, October 22, albeit as a tropical storm.

=== Hurricane Ten ===
- Category 2 hurricane (SSHWS)
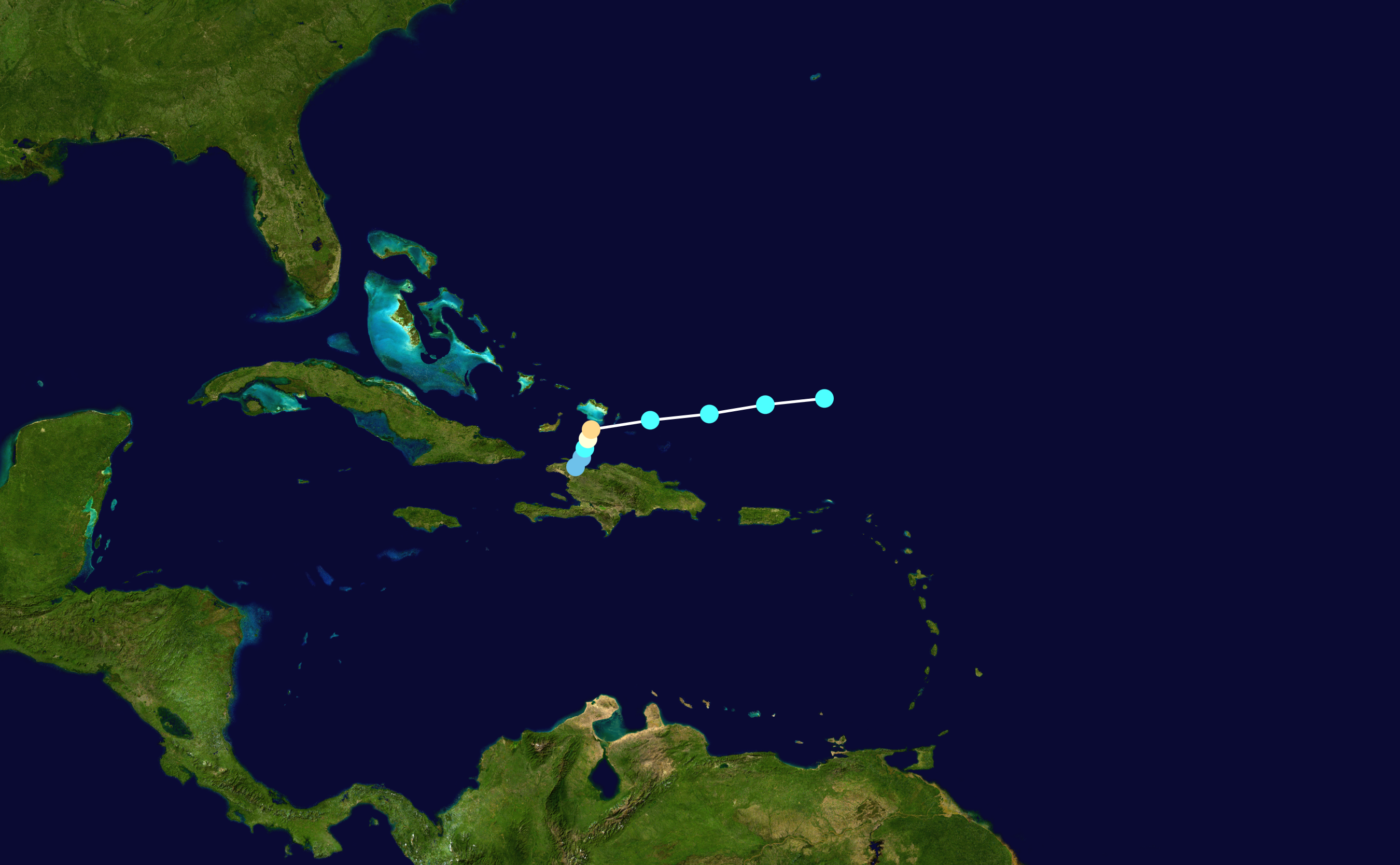
- Duration: October 23 – October 23
- Peak intensity: 105 mph (165 km/h) (1-min);

Several ships north of Cuba and Hispaniola reported a hurricane on October 23 and 24. No further details about this storm are known. According to Chenoweth's reanalysis, published in 2014, this storm originated along or just offshore the north coast of Haiti as a tropical depression on October 22. The cyclone is last noted on October 24, having peaked as a strong tropical storm rather attaining hurricane status.

=== Hurricane Eleven ===
- Category 1 hurricane (SSHWS)
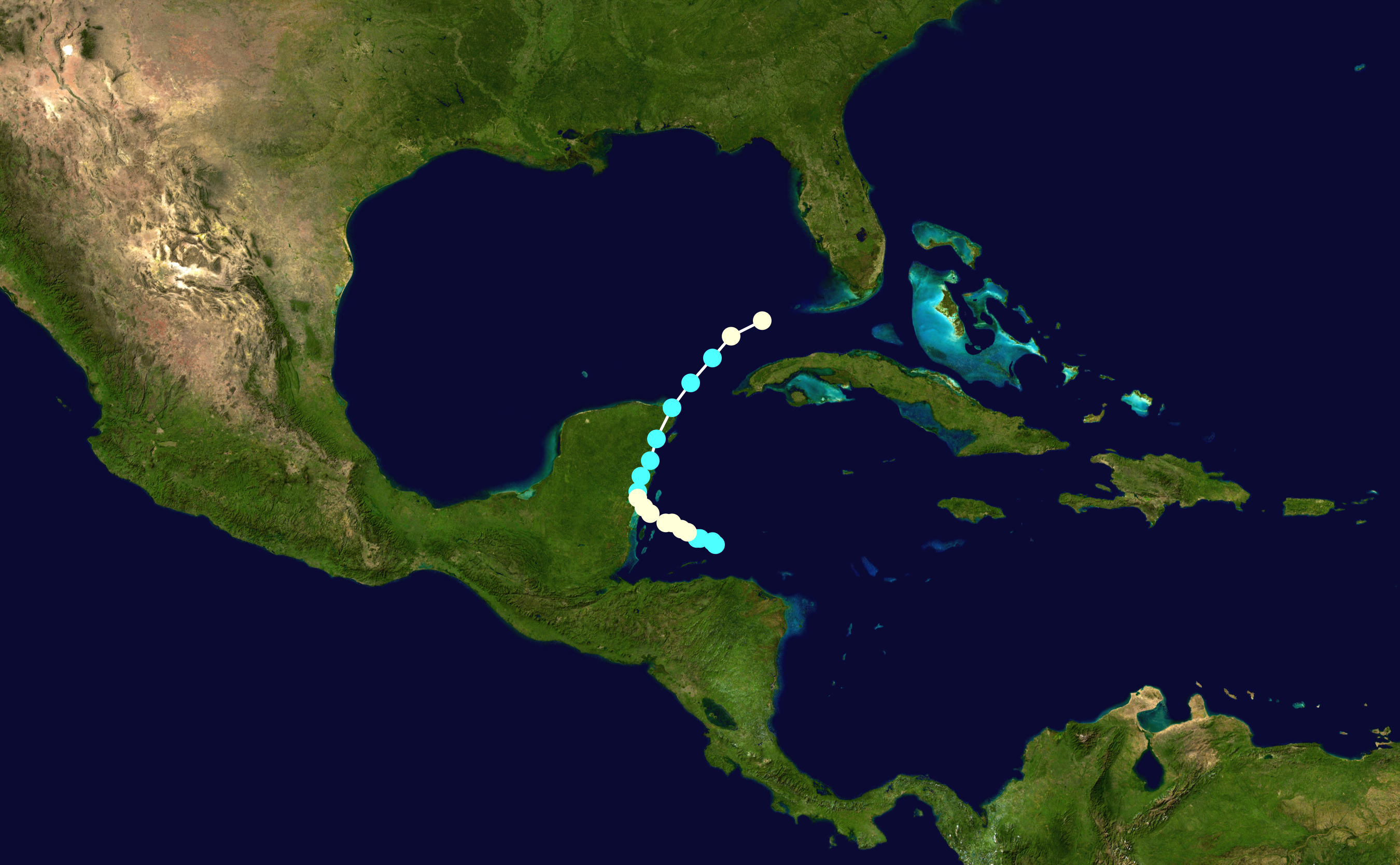
- Duration: October 30 – November 3
- Peak intensity: 80 mph (130 km/h) (1-min);

The final known storm of the season originated from an area of unsettled weather that began affecting ships in the western Caribbean Sea on October 27. However, reanalysis could not confirm the existence of a tropical cyclone until October 30, when it was centered about 40 mi (65 km) northeast of Honduras's Swan Islands. Maritime reports suggest that it achieved minimal hurricane intensity by the following day and then moved onshore just north of the British Honduras (modern-day Belize)-Mexico border on November 1. The hurricane probably curved northward and weakened to a tropical storm upon reaching the mountainous terrain of the Yucatán Peninsula. On November 3, a ship encountered the storm at hurricane intensity in the southeastern Gulf of Mexico.

Chenoweth proposes that this storm began as a tropical storm over the south-central Caribbean on October 27. The system remains a hurricane despite its passage over the Yucatán Peninsula. After reaching the southern Gulf of Mexico, the storm instead turns back to the southwest by November 2, with the track ending east of Cancún two days later.

=== Other storms ===
Although HURDAT currently identifies 11 tropical cyclones for the 1870 season, climate researcher Michael Chenoweth recognized 14 storms as part of a reanalysis published in 2014. Chenoweth combined four systems into two and proposed five new, unofficial storms.

According to the study, the first unofficial cyclone formed late on August 1 as a tropical depression near the coast of Senegal. Moving roughly due west, the system intensified into a tropical storm and passed south of the Cabo Verde Islands before dissipating late on the following day. On September 20, the track for the second unofficial storm begins southwest of the Cabo Verde Islands. This storm moved west-northwestward to northwestward for several days, until curving northeastward around September 29. It became extratropical late on October 1, hours after passing through the Azores. A third unofficial storm reportedly existed on October 24, moving northwestward from a position southwest of the Cabo Verde Islands for several hours.

The fourth unofficial storm formed on November 5 as a tropical depression over the east-central Atlantic, well west of Madeira. The system moved west-southwestward through November 8, one day before attaining hurricane status. Thereafter, the cyclone trekked generally northeastward until becoming extratropical west of the Azores on November 11. The fifth and final proposed storm begins on November 20 as a tropical storm about halfway between the Lesser Antilles and Cabo Verde Islands. Moving northwestward until November 22, the cyclone then curved northeastward. Two days later, the system became a hurricane. Early on November 26, the hurricane became extratropical north of the Azores.

== Season effects ==
This is a table of all of the known storms that formed in the 1870 Atlantic hurricane season. It includes their known duration (within the basin), areas affected, damages, and death totals. Deaths in parentheses are additional and indirect (an example of an indirect death would be a traffic accident), but were still related to that storm. Damage and deaths include totals while the storm was extratropical, a wave, or a low, and all of the damage figures are in 1870 USD.

Saffir–Simpson scale
TD	TS	C1	C2	C3	C4	C5

1870 North Atlantic tropical cyclone season statistics
Storm name	Dates active	Storm category at peak intensity	Max 1-min wind mph (km/h)	Min. press. (mbar)	Areas affected	Damage (US$)	Deaths	Ref(s).
One	July 30	Category 1 hurricane	80 (130)	985	Alabama	$250,000	None	
Two	August 30 – September 4	Category 2 hurricane	105 (165)	Unknown	Maine, Nova Scotia, Newfoundland	Unknown	None	
Three	September 1–4	Tropical storm	70 (110)	1004	None	None	None	
Four	September 9–12	Category 3 hurricane	125 (205)	948	Bermuda	Unknown	None	
Five	September 21	Category 1 hurricane	90 (150)	969	None	None	None	
Six	October 5–14	Category 3 hurricane	115 (185)	959	Cuba, Florida, Bahamas	$12 million	≥800	
Seven	October 7	Category 1 hurricane	80 (130)	Unknown	None	None	None	
Eight	October 10–11	Category 1 hurricane	80 (130)	Unknown	None	None	None	
Nine	October 19–22	Category 2 hurricane	105 (165)	970	Cuba, Florida, Bahamas	$5 million	95	
Ten	October 23	Category 2 hurricane	105 (165)	Unknown	Hispaniola	None	None	
Eleven	October 30 – November 3	Category 1 hurricane	80 (130)	Unknown	Belize, Yucatán Peninsula	Unknown	None	
Season aggregates
11 systems	July 30 – November 3		125 (205)	948		>$17.25 million	≥895	

== See also ==
- Tropical cyclone observation
- List of Bermuda hurricanes
- List of hurricanes in Canada
- List of Florida hurricanes (pre-1900)
