= 1870 Matanzas hurricane =

1870 Atlantic hurricane that hit Cuba

Matanzas hurricane
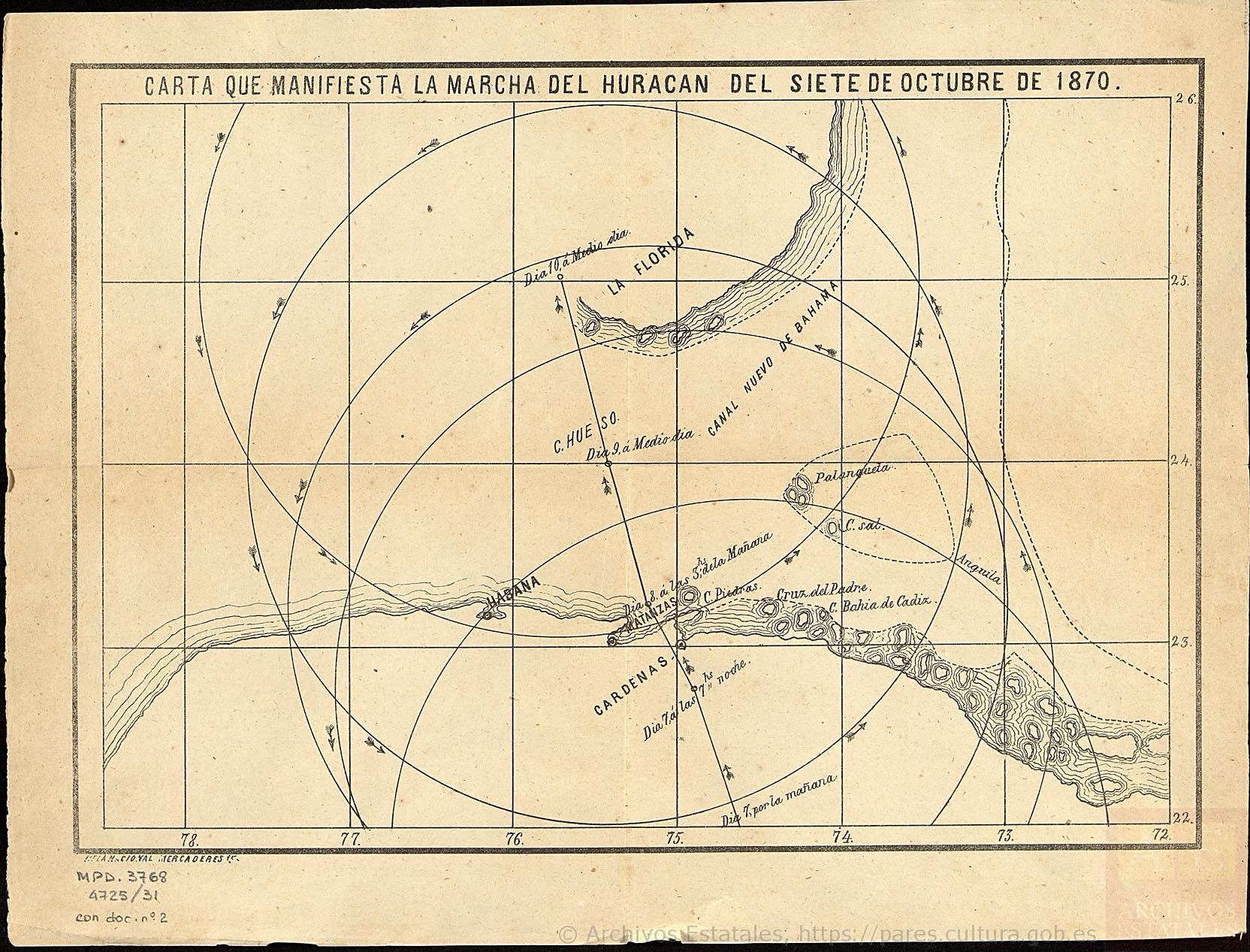
- Ministry of Overseas map depicting the progress of the hurricane

Meteorological history
- Formed: October 5, 1870
- Dissipated: October 14, 1870

Category 3 major hurricane
- 1-minute sustained (SSHWS/NWS)
- Highest winds: 115 mph (185 km/h)
- Lowest pressure: 959 mbar (hPa); 28.32 inHg

Overall effects
- Fatalities: ≥800
- Damage: $12 million (1870 USD)
- Areas affected: Greater Antilles (Cuba landfall), Florida, and the Bahamas
- Part of the 1870 Atlantic hurricane season

The 1870 Matanzas hurricane, also known as the First Key West Hurricane of 1870 or Hurricane of San Marcos, devastated western Cuba in early October. The sixth known cyclone and fifth hurricane of the season, this system was first observed over the central Caribbean Sea on October 5. The storm moved west-northwestward and intensified into a hurricane south of Cuba on the following day. Thereafter, the cyclone rapidly strengthened further and likely peaked as a Category 3 hurricane on the present-day Saffir–Simpson scale with winds of 115 mph (185 km/h) prior to striking modern-day Matanzas Province in Cuba on October 7. After crossing Cuba, the hurricane moved slowly northeastward through the Straits of Florida, tracking close to the Florida Keys as a Category 2 hurricane for a few days. The storm then struck Grand Bahama and the Abaco Islands in the Bahamas early on October 12 while still a Category 2 hurricane, but soon weakened to Category 1 status. It moved out to sea, last being seen west of Bermuda on October 14.

In Cuba, the hurricane produced high winds and intensive rainfall. Two rivers, the San Juan and the Yumurí, burst their banks, devastating Matanzas. These impacts included approximately 410 homes being destroyed, likely within the city alone. Floodwaters swept away two bridges, a railroad station, and a train, along with its passengers. The nearby city of Cárdenas reported major damage to warehouses and wharves, as well as the destruction of several dwellings; many more lost their roofs or otherwise suffered damage. Throughout the country, a loss of roughly one-third of sugar crops occurred. At least 800 people died in Cuba, making it one of the deadliest Atlantic hurricanes on record. Damage was estimated at over $12 million (1870 USD; $262 million in 2024). (Note: All damage figures are in 1870 USD, unless otherwise noted) In Florida, the lower parts of Key West flooded and tides carried away a few bridges. Significant damage to vegetation and trees also occurred. Numerous vessels wrecked as far north as the Jupiter Inlet. In the Bahamas, Bimini reportedly began experiencing the storm as early as October 7. Abnormally high tides inundated South Bimini, while the hurricane also capsized and dismasted a number of ships sailing in the vicinity of the Bahamas.

== Meteorological history ==
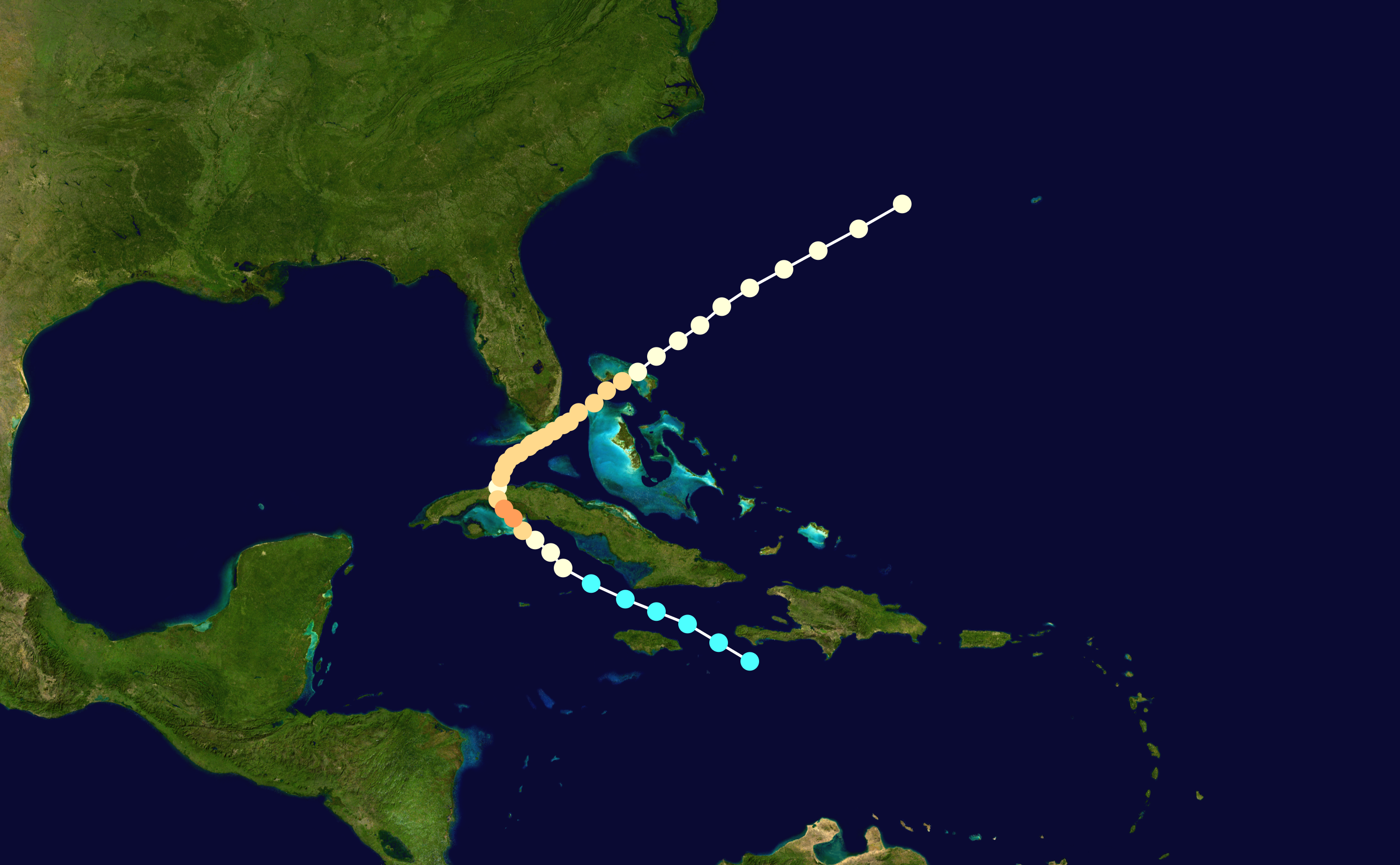
Map plotting the storm's track and intensity, according to the Saffir–Simpson scale Map key Saffir–Simpson scale Tropical depression (≤38 mph, ≤62 km/h) Tropical storm (39–73 mph, 63–118 km/h) Category 1 (74–95 mph, 119–153 km/h) Category 2 (96–110 mph, 154–177 km/h) Category 3 (111–129 mph, 178–208 km/h) Category 4 (130–156 mph, 209–251 km/h) Category 5 (≥157 mph, ≥252 km/h) Unknown Storm type Tropical cyclone Subtropical cyclone Extratropical cyclone, remnant low, tropical disturbance, or monsoon depression

Cuban meteorologist Manuel Fernández de Castro y Suero noted in his 1871 study entitled Estudio Sobre los Huracanes de la Isla de Cuba durante el mes de octubre de 1870 that a tropical cyclone developed around 19°N over the Caribbean Sea between Cuba, Haiti, and Jamaica on October 5. The Atlantic hurricane reanalysis project in 2003 opted to begin the track of this system about 35 mi (55 km) south of Haiti's Tiburon Peninsula on that day. The storm moved west-northwestward and intensified into a hurricane south of Cuba on the following day. Thereafter, the cyclone rapidly strengthened further and likely peaked with maximum sustained winds of 115 mph (185 km/h) around 12:00 UTC on October 7, making it a Category 3 hurricane on the present-day Saffir–Simpson scale. Prior to Ramón Pérez Suarez's 2000 research uncovering an atmospheric pressure of 959 mbar (28.3 inHg) in Nueva Paz, mathematical calculations by Father Benito Viñes, including an atmospheric pressure of 969 mbar (28.6 inHg) at Matanzas, led him to conclude that the storm possessed sustained winds as high as 102 mph (164 km/h), corresponding to Category 2 status. He also calculated that the strongest winds extended 25–30 mi (40–50 km) from the center.

Shortly after 12:00 UTC on October 7, the hurricane made landfall along the Zapata Peninsula, located in the Ciénaga de Zapata municipality of Cuba's Matanzas Province with winds still at 115 mph (185 km/h). The cyclone briefly crossed the Ensenada de la Broa before striking land again between Playa Mayabeque and Playa del Rosario in modern-day Mayabeque Province, likely as a Category 2 hurricane with winds of 105 mph (165 km/h). Although Fernández de Castro expressed uncertainty about the location of landfall, Viñes believed that the storm moved ashore east of Playa del Rosario due to wind and atmospheric pressure data from Havana. Viñes and Father Mariano Gutiérrez-Lanza both stated that the hurricane recurved over the island, with the latter noting a very small inclination to moving northeastward, though the former estimated a sharper turn, indicating that the storm passed between Madruga and Nueva Paz before emerging into the Straits of Florida near Matanzas. Gutiérrez-Lanza noted that Nueva Paz and Matanzas reported a temporary calmness associated with the cyclone. However, the Atlantic hurricane database (HURDAT) indicates no eastward movement before 06:00 UTC on October 8, at which time the storm was approaching the Straits of Florida close to Boca de Jaruco.

Having weakened to Category 1 intensity just before reaching the Straits of Florida early on October 8, the cyclone quickly re-strengthened into a Category 2 hurricane as it moved slowly northeastward. Between October 9 and October 11, the hurricane passed close to the Florida Keys, coming within 15 mi (25 km) of landfall on October 10. After brushing the island chain and southern Florida, the storm then struck Grand Bahama and the Abaco Islands in the Bahamas early on October 12 as a Category 2 hurricane. Although the steamship Morro Castle recorded sustained winds of 104 mph (167 km/h) just south of the Abaco Islands on that day, subsequent observations suggest that the cyclone soon began weakening, falling to Category 1 status later on October 12. It moved out to sea, last being seen on October 14 by the brigs Iris and Toronto. The track listed in HURDAT ends at 18:00 UTC about 245 mi (395 km) west of Bermuda.

A study by climate scientist Michael Chenoweth in 2014 instead initiated the track of this system over the Cayman Islands near Little Cayman on October 5. Chenoweth concluded that the storm avoided striking the Zapata Peninsula and made landfall slightly farther west, between Playa Mayabeque and Surgidero de Batabanó. After emerging into the Straits of Florida, the hurricane rapidly intensified, briefly peaking as a Category 5 hurricane with winds of 160 mph (260 km/h), based on a peripheral atmospheric pressure of 914 mbar (27.0 inHg) on September 9. If confirmed, this would represent the earliest recorded Category 5 Atlantic hurricane in HURDAT, surpassing the current record-holder, in 1924. However, the results of the study remain preliminary as of 2024. The hurricane continued northeastward through October 16, by which time it became extratropical east of Newfoundland.

== Impact ==
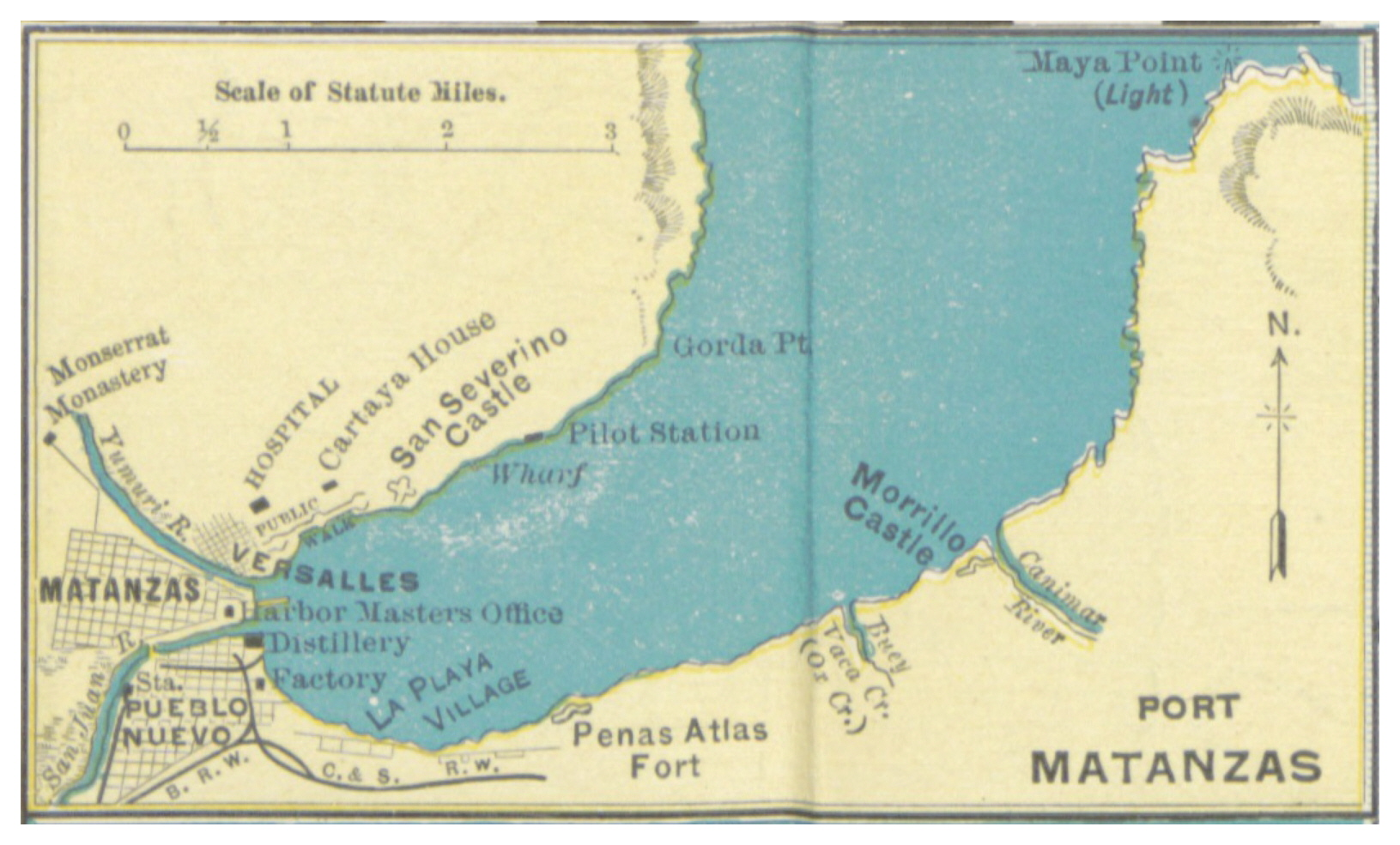
Map of the port of Mantanzas in 1898

The Sociedad Meteorológica de Cuba (SometCuba) described the storm as one of the worst natural disasters in Cuba during the 19th century. Damage was estimated at over $12 million ($262 million in 2024). Further, other sources estimate that the combined damage total in Cuba for this storm and another later in October reached as much as $27 million ($589 million in 2024). Newspapers also reported that the two hurricanes damaged about one-fourth of Cuba's sugar crop, while "the fruit of the island is half destroyed." Throughout the country, the Matanzas hurricane destroyed loss of roughly one-third of sugar crops occurred – roughly 300,000 to 400,000 boxes. Weather Bureau meteorologist Edward B. Garriott stated in 1900 that "all crops in the territory between the meridians of Sagua and western Havana were destroyed." At least 800 people died in Cuba from this cyclone alone, making it one of the deadliest Atlantic hurricanes on record. However, The Times lists the death toll as high as 2,000. SometCuba argued in 2000 that the 800 death toll figure is likely more accurate, as it was taken from a publication released two weeks after the storm.

The hurricane produced high winds and intensive rainfall, which impacted Matanzas for more than 30 hours. Consequently, two rivers, the San Juan and the Yumuri, burst their banks, devastating the city. In the Pueblo Nuevo neighborhood, inundation from the rivers and Matanzas Bay "brought death to the door of every family within its limits.", according to an account from the steamer Moro Castle. These impacts destroyed approximately 410 homes, with SometCuba stating in 2000 that "this number probably refers only to the city [Matanzas]." Floodwaters swept away about 750 street lamps, 2 bridges, a railroad station, and a train, along with its passengers. Approximately 60 people became trapped at the San Luis railroad station, with floodwaters as high as 20 ft (6 m) forcing them to climb to the roof. A total of 13 vessels at Matanzas suffered damage, capsized, or were pushed ashore. However, the ships Geo Hunt, Liberty, Manlius, Mary Chase, and Nichols collectively rescued 19 people. Nearby, Cárdenas reported major damage to warehouses and wharves, as well as the destruction of several dwellings; many more lost their roofs or otherwise suffered damage. Seven deaths occurred in the city and another eleven in the Bay of Cárdenas, six after the bark M. E. capsized. Approximately 12,000 heads of cattle drowned in Cárdenas and Matanzas combined.

Significant impacts occurred in the eastern portions of the former Havana Province, an area now part of Mayabeque Province. In Playa del Rosario, the "la destrucción fue casi total." ("the destruction was almost total."), according to the bulletin of the SometCuba. Officials reported that the hurricane demolished the church, the townhall, and at least 115 homes in Nueva Paz. Whole streets disappeared. Additionally, the sugar industry experienced major impacts, with damaged mills and ruined sugarcane fields. Many dwellings collapsed in Papian, where the storm also damaged crops and trees and caused domestic birds to disappear. A meteorological observatory in the city of Havana recorded barometric pressures as low as 991 mbar (29.3 inHg). The storm unroofed some homes, ripped off some window blinds and shutters, and floodwaters damaged roads, leaving street cars unable to operate. At the harbor, several vessels drifted away, but little damage occurred other than to their rigs, although some vessels elsewhere along the coast were beached. Tree also toppled in the city.

In Güines, the hurricane destroyed a church, factories, and small homes and damaged many other buildings. Flooding ruined grain crops and drowned animals. More than 100 homes owned by impoverished people in Madruga collapsed. Another 50 residences were demolished in Bejucal, where the hurricane also uprooted many trees and ruined all local crops. In Alacranes, Bejucal, Güines, and Madruga, "the loss of lives in those villages, providentially, was small, considering the extent of the material damages experienced, and will not exceed twelve.", according to newspaper reports. Bainoa, Jaruco, and Tibarca reported destroyed homes, while several other towns noted damage to dwellings. In Colón, the hurricane damaged some residences and knocked down walls and telegraph lines. The suburbs flooded, leaving some streets impassable and forcing residents to evacuate.

The Florida Keys experienced hurricane-force winds, including a sustained wind speed of 81 mph (130 km/h) in Key West, while a barometer reportedly averaged 982 mbar (29.0 inHg) for a few days. Tides caused the lower parts of the island to become "one complete sheet of water", according to the Key West Dispatch, while a few bridges were swept away. This left communications with the north side of Key West only possible by boat. Significant damage to vegetation and trees also occurred. Numerous vessels wrecked throughout the Florida Keys and along or just offshore the mainland as far north as the Jupiter Inlet. In the Bahamas, Bimini reportedly began experiencing the storm as early as October 7. Abnormally high tides inundated South Bimini, leaving people "reduced to a state of starvation", according to The Nassau Guardian. The hurricane also capsized and dismasted a number of ships sailing in the vicinity of the Bahamas.

== Aftermath ==
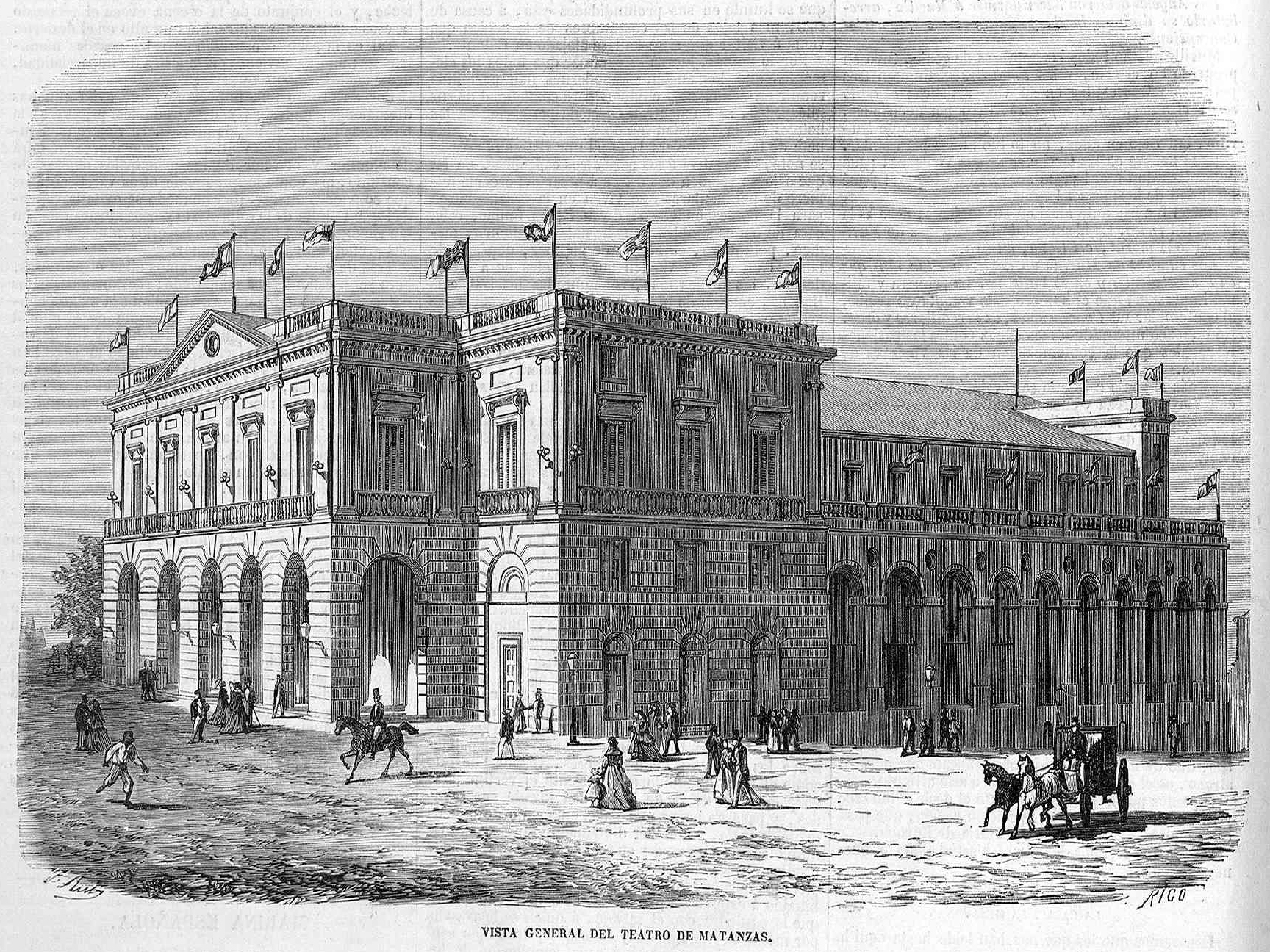
Teatro Esteban in 1866

Storm survivors in Matanzas initially sought refuge in the Government's House and at Teatro Esteban. Looting and violence occurred in the city following the hurricane, leading to the arrest of twenty people, three of whom were executed by firing squad. Consequently, Juan Nepomuceno Burriel deployed more than 1,300 troops to the area to restore order. A survivor also recounted that some local merchants engaged in price gouging. Captain General Antonio Caballero y Fernández de Rodas ordered that the Spanish government expend $500,000 in aid for both storms combined. Captain General Rodas also sent 100 prisoners from Havana to Matanzas to clean streets and 80 firefighters to assist with rebuilding homes in the Pueblo Nuevo neighborhood. Additionally, six physicians were dispatched to the city in response to outbreaks of sicknesses and diseases, especially cholera and yellow fever. By October 20, authorities in Matanzas were providing assistance to approximately 3,000 homeless individuals. Many Cubans and Spaniards donated to relief funds, dispensed by authorities and churches, to not only Matanzas but also to localities such as Güines, Madruga, and Nueva Paz.

Father Benito Viñes, a Spanish Jesuit priest, became the director of the meteorological observatory at the Colegio de Belén in Havana, Cuba, in 1870. Following two storms that devastated the country in October of that year, Viñes began studying those hurricanes and previous systems – including their circulations, organization, and movements – becoming a pioneer in tropical cyclone forecasting. Later, Viñes issued possibly the first-ever hurricane warning in 1875 and founded a network of weather stations across the Caribbean Sea in 1876 to improve his forecasts.

== See also ==
- List of Atlantic hurricanes
- List of Florida hurricanes (pre-1900)
- 1909 Florida Keys hurricane
- 1926 Havana–Bermuda hurricane
