= Pueblo Nuevo, Matanzas =

Pueblo Nuevo
- Ward & Neighborhood
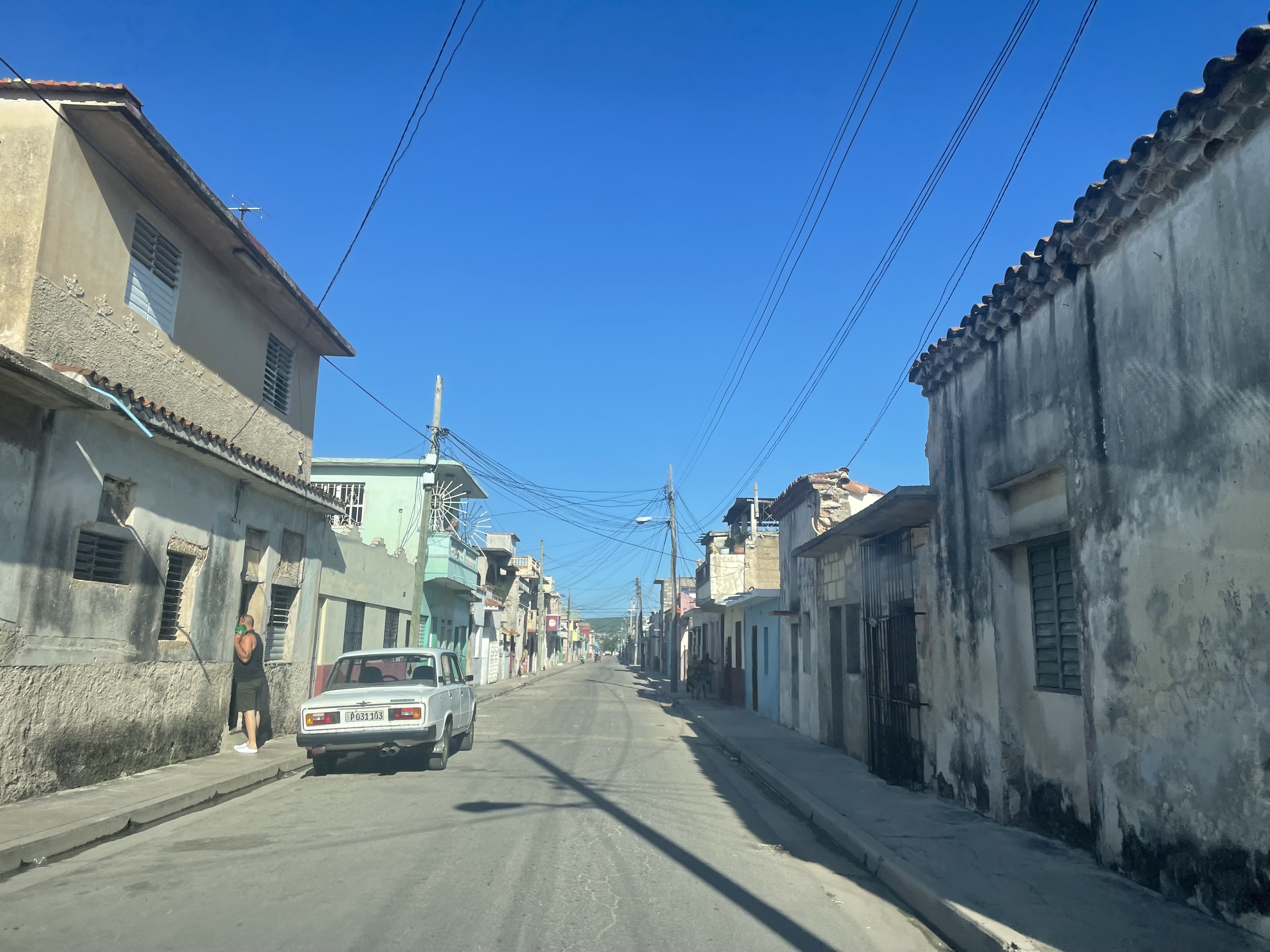
- Streets of Pueblo Nuevo, 2023

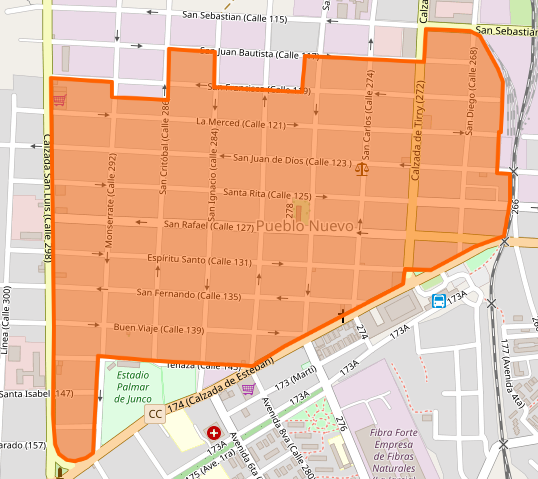
- Map of Pueblo Nuevo (OpenStreetMap)

- Location within Cuba
- Coordinates: 23.038°N 81.577°W
- Country: Cuba
- Province: Matanzas
- Municipality: Matanzas

Government
  - Representative: Ileana Fajardo

Pueblo Nuevo is a ward (consejo popular) of the National Assembly of People's Power in the municipality of Matanzas, Matanzas, Cuba. It used to be one of the three neighborhoods (barrios) of Matanzas.
