= List of Florida hurricanes (pre-1900) =

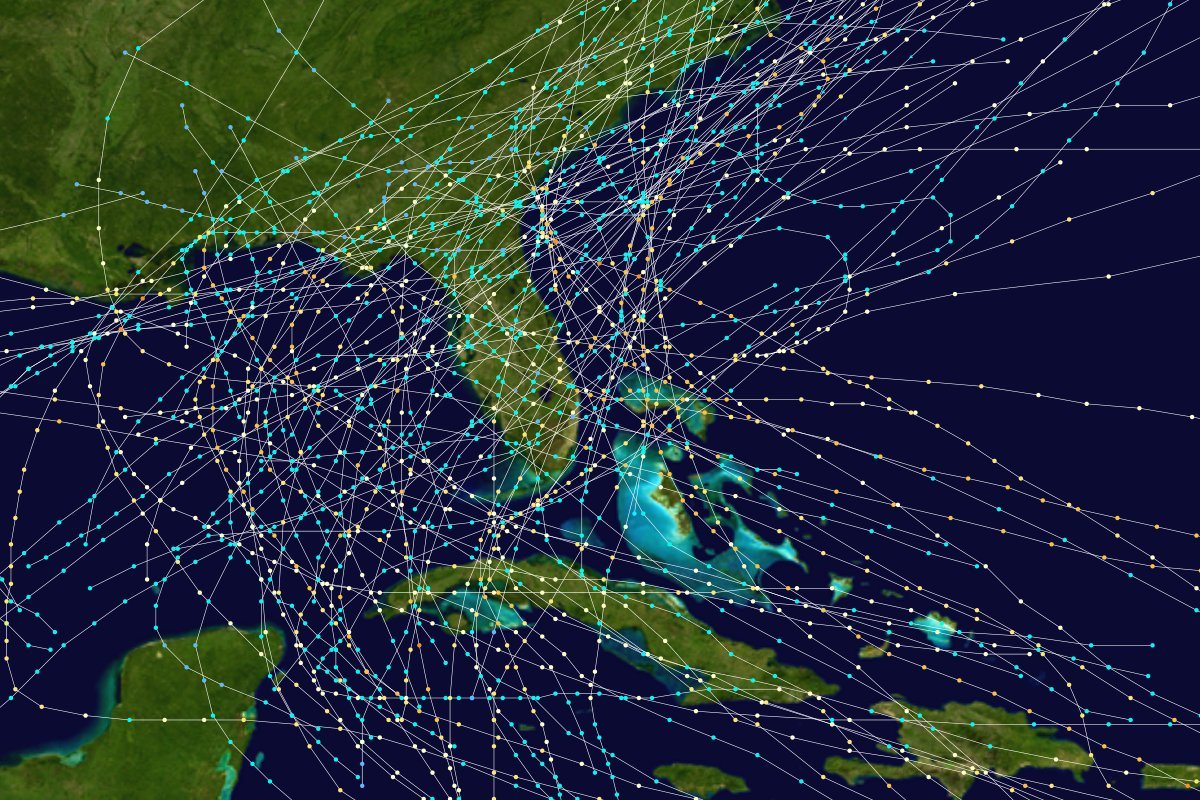
Tracks of hurricanes over Florida from 1851 to 1899

From 1523 to 1900, 180 tropical cyclones were known to have affected the U.S. state of Florida. Since the start of the Atlantic hurricane database in 1851, there were only eight years in which no tropical cyclone affected the state. Collectively, tropical cyclones in Florida resulted in at least 6,504 fatalities and monetary damage of over $90 million (2008 USD). At least 109 boats or ships were either driven ashore, wrecked, or damaged due to the storms.

Information is sparse for earlier years due to limitations in tropical cyclone observation, though as coastlines became more populated, more data became available. The National Hurricane Center recognizes the uncertainty in both the death tolls and the dates of the events.

== Pre-1700 ==
- 1523 – Two ships and their crews were lost during a hurricane on the west Florida coast.
- 1549 – Hernando de Escalante Fontaneda survived a shipwreck due to a hurricane off Florida, and the Calusa rescued the crew and passengers. They then sacrificed all the other castaways but enslaved him; he escaped after 17 years in captivity and reported the tale.
- 1553 – A hurricane affected the state, killing fewer than 700 people.
- Around 1553 – A hurricane hit western Florida, resulting in about 700 casualties. Some modern researchers estimate this is the same storm as the previous event, as some early storms affecting more than one locale may have multiple listings if the storm track is unknown.
- 1559 – A hurricane off northwestern Florida sank six Spanish ships.
- August 20, 1559 – Around 500 people were killed by a hurricane offshore off western Florida.
- September 19, 1559 – A hurricane off the coast of Florida sank several ships and killed many sailors. Pensacola history notes this hurricane sinking 5 ships, with a Spanish galleon, grounding a caravel, and killing nearly 500 of 1,500 colonists and crewmen at Punta de Santa Maria across from Santa Rosa Island.
- 1563 – Cape Canaveral experienced the effects of a hurricane, with 284 fatalities reported.
- September 22, 1565 – An offshore hurricane washed several French ships ashore between Matanzas Inlet and Cape Canaveral, leaving 71 missing. The hurricane led to the loss of Fort Caroline and ultimately the French influence in Florida.
- September 13, 1566 – Rough seas and strong winds were experienced in the northeastern portion of the state by an offshore hurricane. It executed a loop and affected the area three days later.
- September 26, 1566 – An offshore hurricane washed a ship ashore near Cape Canaveral.
- 1571 – Two ships were lost on the Florida coastline during a hurricane, with few survivors.
- Fall 1571 – A hurricane made landfall near Saint Augustine, causing great damage to the city from strong winds and a powerful storm surge.
- 1589 – One ship was wrecked during a hurricane along the eastern coast of the state.
- 1591 – 29 ships were lost along the coastal region of Florida during several tropical cyclones.
- September 22, 1599 – A hurricane made landfall a short distance south of Saint Augustine, destroying several houses and flooding the entire town.
- September 5, 1622 – 1,090 people were killed during a hurricane in the Straits of Florida.
- August 1638 – A hurricane struck the northeastern portion of the state, though its effects, if any, are unknown.
- September 27, 1641 – After passing over the Florida Straits, a hurricane wrecked five ships. The storm produced tropical storm force winds and rough seas along the northeastern portion of the state.
- August 19, 1674 – A hurricane known as the Great Storm of 1674 hit near Saint Augustine, and severely damaged the town and its fort from rough seas.
- 1683 – 496 people died from a hurricane that affected east-central Florida, though modern researchers question whether it was a hurricane or not.
- October 4, 1695 – A large ship was wrecked in the Florida Keys due to a passing hurricane.

== 1700s ==
- September 30, 1707 – A hurricane made landfall near or to the south of Saint Augustine. Most of the houses in the town were destroyed due to the winds and storm surge. The storm dropped rainfall there for at least 24 hours.
- Late June 1714 – Several ships were wrecked due to a hurricane in the Florida Keys.
- July 31, 1715 – A hurricane sank 11 Spanish ships along a path from Ft. Pierce and south of Cape Canaveral carrying Gold and Silver; today this is known as the Treasure Coast.
- July 15, 1733 – A hurricane passed through The Bahamas and southern Florida, killing a total of 56 people.
- 1741 – A hurricane hit northwest Florida at Santa Rosa Island.
- October 22, 1752 – Multiple vessels were lost during a hurricane off the state.
- November 3, 1752 – A large storm hit northwest Florida at Santa Rosa Island, at Presidio Isla de Santa Rosa, destroying all but two buildings. The settlement was abandoned at the island and moved across the bay to what is now Pensacola.
- August 24, 1753 – A tropical storm passing through the northeastern portion of the state dropped heavy precipitation.
- 1758 – A hurricane which struck St. Marks resulted in 40 fatalities.
- 1762 – The remaining settlement remnants at Santa Rosa Island were wiped out by another hurricane.
- October 23, 1766 – A ship capsized due to a hurricane off northwestern Florida.
- September 25, 1769 – Northeastern Florida experienced strong winds from a hurricane, though it is unknown if it made landfall or not.
- October 29, 1769 – A strong hurricane hit Miami, blowing down several trees and grounding a ship.
- June 1777 – A ship was lost off Florida, with the entire crew missing and believed killed.
- October 14, 1780 – A storm, possibly related to the Great Hurricane of 1780, impacted the northeastern portion of the state with moderate winds and severe beach erosion.
- 1781 – About 2,000 people were killed due to a hurricane off the coast of the state.
- Early October 1794 – A hurricane estimated to have moved inland from the southwestern portion of the state resulted in moderate beach erosion near Jacksonville.
- October 17, 1797 – An offshore hurricane capsized a few ships off the eastern coast of Florida.

== 1800–1849 ==
- September 7, 1804 – An offshore hurricane sank eight ships in the harbor of Saint Augustine and destroyed the Quasada Battery at the mouth of the St. Johns River from its storm surge.
- September 15, 1806 – Saint Augustine received a landfall from a severe hurricane that destroyed several houses, uprooted many trees, washed several vessels ashore, and destroyed the city pier.
- October 4, 1811 – A hurricane of moderate intensity struck near Saint Augustine, with many houses in the city damaged or destroyed. Shipwrecks were reported throughout the eastern Florida coastline. Several destroyed homes are not rebuilt for 11 years.
- October 1, 1812 – A hurricane remained stationary offshore off northeastern Florida, producing severe conditions along portions of the St. Johns River.
- September 16, 1813 – The eye of a major hurricane passed over the border between Florida and Georgia.
- August 7, 1817 – A tropical storm hit near Apalachicola Bay, though its effects are unknown.
- September 1819 – Heavy rainfall was caused by a tropical storm making landfall between New Orleans and Apalachicola.
- September 15, 1821 – A hurricane estimated to have made landfall near the border of Alabama and Mississippi produced high tides along the Florida Panhandle, sinking six ships in Pensacola and causing minor damage to homes.
- July 8, 1822 – A ship was breached along the extreme western Florida Panhandle as a result of a tropical storm striking Mississippi.
- September 14, 1824 – A storm which moved inland near Darien, Georgia brought hurricane force conditions to northeastern Florida.
- June 2, 1825 – An early season storm produced gusty and rainy conditions in northeastern Florida after hitting between Cedar Key and Apalachicola.
- October 2, 1825 – Saint Augustine was struck by a minimal hurricane. The hurricane produced a 4-foot storm surge, causing some damage to houses, while moderate winds washed four ships aground and damaged orange crops.
- August 15, 1830 – A hurricane which ultimately moved inland on South Carolina paralleled the eastern coast of the state, bringing strong winds and rain to coastal areas.
- August 22, 1830 – Just days after the previous storm, another hurricane impacted and paralleled the eastern coastline.
- June 10, 1831 – A tropical storm which struck the Florida Panhandle brought strong winds to Saint Augustine.
- Early August 1835 – An offshore tropical storm produced winds in excess of 40 mph (65 km/h) in the northeastern portion of the state.
- August 15, 1835 – Key West and the Dry Tortugas reported gusty winds from a hurricane passing through central Cuba, passing by Key West in the Gulf of Mexico, and ultimately ending up at the mouth of the Rio Grande in Texas on August 18.
- September 14, 1835 – A major hurricane struck southeastern Florida, moved across the state, and recurved in the Gulf of Mexico before hitting near Tampa Bay. In the southeastern portion of the state, the hurricane severely flooded several islands, while damage in and around Tampa totaled $200,000 (1835 USD, $4.1 million 2008 USD). After moving northeastward through the state, the hurricane destroyed the lighthouse at the Ponce de León Inlet.
- September 14–15, 1835 – A hurricane struck Key West on the 14th and 15th. It was the first good account of hurricane activity near Key West island as the island was sparsely populated before 1830.
- August 1, 1837 – East-central Florida was struck by a minimal hurricane which produced heavy rainfall and strong winds for northeastern Florida.
- August 7, 1837 – A storm estimated to have struck Mississippi destroyed several warehouses in Saint Marks from its 6-foot (1.8 m) storm surge.
- August 7, 1837 – Simultaneously existing with the previous storm, a hurricane moved ashore near Fernandina Beach, destroying at least 19 buildings from moderate winds and higher than usual tides.
- August 16, 1837 – A storm known as the Calypso Hurricane paralleled the eastern coastline offshore and produced tropical storm force winds in the northeastern portion of the state.
- Mid-August 1837 – A hurricane made landfall south of Saint Augustine and after moving northwestward through the state it passed through Tallahassee.
- August 30, 1837 – A small storm estimated to have been a major hurricane struck the northwestern Florida coastline. Considered by some to be the most severe gale in the area, the hurricane produced tides estimated at 15 feet (4.6 m) above normal. Flooding from the storm damaged or destroyed multiple buildings, causing eight deaths and $230,000 in damage (1837 USD, $4.4 million 2008 USD).
- September 13, 1837 – Saint Augustine reported moderate northeasterly winds from a nearby hurricane, though other details are unknown.
- September 24, 1837 – A tropical storm believed to have struck the east-central coastline produced moderate winds in northeastern Florida.
- October 7, 1837 – The Racer's Storm moved inland to the west of the state, causing moderate damage along the Florida Panhandle.
- September 7, 1838 – A hurricane struck near Key Biscayne, killing 38 people.
- September 14, 1841 – The town of St. Joseph was destroyed by a hurricane hitting the Florida Panhandle.
- October 18, 1841 – A northeastward moving hurricane passed south of the Florida Keys and washed many ships aground.
- August 2, 1842 – A weak tropical storm produced heavy rainfall in northeastern Florida.
- September 4, 1842 – Moderate damage was caused by a hurricane passing Key West.
- September 22, 1842 – A tropical storm made landfall near Pensacola.
- October 4, 1842 – A 955 mbar major hurricane which made landfall on northwestern Florida produced a 20-foot (6 m) storm surge at Cedar Key. Strong winds resulted in severe damage in Tallahassee, where damage amounted to $500,000 (1842 USD, $11.1 million 2008 USD). Saint Augustine reported strong winds and heavy rainfall.
- October 26, 1842 – An offshore storm produced tropical storm force winds and high tides.
- September 13, 1843 – Port Leon was struck by a strong hurricane and was nearly destroyed by its 10-foot (3 m) storm surge. Residents in the city moved four miles northward in response to the hurricane and formed the city of Newport. The hurricane kills 14 in the Florida Panhandle, of which only one occurred in Port Leon.
- September 7, 1844 – A small, intense hurricane hit near Daytona Beach, and is considered by one modern historian to be the most severe storm to affect northeastern Florida in the 19th century. After crossing the state, the eye passed over Apalachicola where its strong winds destroyed the roofs of several buildings.
- October 4, 1844 – A large hurricane passed through the Florida Straits and produced high tides and strong winds along the eastern coastline.
- October 11, 1846 – The Great Havana Hurricane of 1846 passed near Key West with an estimated pressure of 902 mbar (hPa) and winds of possibly Category 5 status, damaging or destroying all but 6 of the houses in the city. 50 are killed, and damage amounts to $200,000 (1846 USD, $4.8 million 2008 USD). It is estimated it struck mainland Florida near Cedar Key, producing severe flooding and strong winds.
- September 25, 1848 – The Great Gale of 1848 struck near Tampa as a major hurricane with an estimated pressure of 948 mbar. Considered one of the most significant hurricanes in the Tampa area, the 15 foot (4.6 m) storm surge from the hurricane destroyed much of Tampa and nearby Fort Brooke.
- October 11, 1848 – A major hurricane hit northwestern Florida, causing additional damage to the severe hurricane a few weeks before.

== 1850–1859 ==
- August 23, 1850 – A large hurricane struck near Apalachicola, with its powerful storm surge destroying many ships and flooding coastal roads.
- August 24, 1851 – Apalachicola was hit by a major hurricane, causing severe damage in the St. Marks area from its 12-foot (3.7 m) storm tide.
- August 22, 1852 – The first hurricane of the season produced hurricane-force winds in the Florida Keys. It later made landfall near the Mississippi/Alabama border, producing strong winds and a pressure of 980 mbar in Pensacola.
- September 12, 1852 – The third hurricane of the season struck near Tampa, producing strong winds and high seas in coastal areas. Rainfall from the storm totaled 0.55 inches (14 mm) at Fort Meade.
- October 9, 1852 – St. Marks was hit by a moderate hurricane which resulted in downed trees and damage to multiple small structures.
- October 20, 1853 – A storm paralleling the northeastern Florida coastline produced hurricane-force winds and coastal flooding.
- September 8, 1854 – The third hurricane of the season paralleled the northeastern Florida coastline as a major hurricane before striking eastern Georgia. Though it was very severe offshore, impact was minor in Florida.
- August 31, 1856 – A Category 2 hurricane hit near Panama City, producing a pressure of 968 mbar and a storm tide of 6 feet (1.8 m) at Apalachicola.
- September 15, 1858 – The third tropical storm of the season hit near Tampa Bay and caused little effects as it crossed the state.
- September 16, 1859 – A hurricane hit southern Alabama and produced hurricane force conditions in western Florida. The storm produced heavy rainfall including a total of 3.3 inches (84 mm) in Barrancas Barracks, and destroyed several buildings near the coast at Pensacola. One ship was washed aground.
- October 17, 1859 – A tropical storm hit near Fort Lauderdale, though effects, if any, are unknown.

== 1860–1869 ==
- August 16, 1861 – The second hurricane of the season passed a short distance to the west of the Florida Keys, producing 35 mph (55 km/h) winds at Fort Jefferson. The storm is believed to have later turned to the northeast, cross over the state, and wash a Confederate ship ashore at Saint Augustine.
- November 1, 1861 – A tropical storm hit near Chokoloskee on the southwest coastline, crossed the state, and exited into the Atlantic Ocean near Cape Canaveral. Impact, if any, is unknown.
- May 28, 1863 – Strong hurricane "Amanda" struck northwest Florida on May 28; the earliest landfall during a year known in the US.
- September 17, 1863 – An offshore tropical storm caused disruption in shipping in the coastal waters off eastern Florida.
- October 23, 1865 – The final hurricane of the season passed through the western Florida Keys and hit near Cape Sable, producing heavy rainfall of 4.1 inches (104 mm) in Key West and strong winds throughout the state.
- October 6, 1867 – A hurricane hit near the mouth of the Steinhatchee River, though effects, if any, are unknown.
- October 4, 1868 – Apalachicola was struck by a tropical storm. There were no reports of damage.

== 1870–1879 ==
- October 9, 1870 – A Category 2 hurricane moved northeastward through the Florida Straits, producing hurricane-force winds across the southern portion of the state. Impact is unknown in the state.
- October 20, 1870 – The eye of a moderate hurricane passed over the Dry Tortugas, producing heavy rainfall and widespread debris. It later struck Chokoloskee, crossed the state, and tracked out to sea. Numerous fatalities were reported in the state.
- August 17, 1871 – A major hurricane made landfall near Palm Beach with a pressure of 952 mbar. The hurricane caused several shipwrecks on the Atlantic coastline, while in Jacksonville moderate winds destroyed the roofs of several weak buildings.
- August 25, 1871 – The fourth tropical storm and second hurricane of the season hit near Palm Beach, causing at least one shipwreck along the coastline.
- September 6, 1871 – A minor hurricane hit near the mouth of the Steinhatchee River and produced heavy rainfall across the state.
- October 5, 1871 – Saint Marks was struck by a tropical storm, though its effects, if any, are unknown.
- October 23, 1872 – A tropical storm hit near Tampa and produced 5.94 inches (151 mm) of rainfall in Jacksonville.
- June 2, 1873 – The first storm of the season hit near the Florida/Georgia border and produced light winds, including a report of 28 mph (45 km/h) in Jacksonville.
- September 19, 1873 – A hurricane hit near Saint Marks and caused heavy damage in Tallahassee.
- September 23, 1873 – Tampa was struck by a tropical storm. Its impact is unknown.
- October 7, 1873 – A major hurricane made landfall near Fort Myers and caused heavy damage in Punta Rassa from its 14-foot (4.3 m) storm tide.
- September 28, 1874 – The sixth storm and third hurricane of the season hit near Yankeetown and, after briefly being downgraded to a tropical storm, exited later that day near the Florida-Georgia state line. Impact is unknown.
- September 14, 1875 – Key West reported 45 mph (70 km/h) winds in association with a hurricane that passed to the southwest of the state.
- September 27, 1875 – A tropical storm hit near Panama City before quickly dissipating. Its effects are unknown.
- September 16, 1876 – Jacksonville experienced 22 mph (35 km/h) from a tropical storm paralleling the east coast of Florida.
- October 20, 1876 – A moderate hurricane passed near Key West and later struck near Cape Sable, though its impact, if any, is unknown.
- September 19, 1877 – After hitting southern Louisiana, a hurricane made landfall near Panama City, though its effects, if any, are unknown.
- October 3, 1877 – The third hurricane of the season struck near Apalachicola as a major hurricane, producing a storm tide of 12 feet (3.7 m) and a pressure of 988 mbar at Saint Marks. Damage, if any, is unknown.
- October 26, 1877 – A tropical storm hit near Cedar Key, causing no known damage.
- July 2, 1878 – The first storm of the season moved onshore just south of Fort Myers, though its effects are unknown.
- September 8, 1878 – A tropical storm hit near Key Largo, moved northwestward, and strengthened in the Gulf of Mexico before looping to the northeast and striking near Yankeetown as a Category 2 hurricane. Rainfall reached 4.93 inches (155 mm) in Key West, and in Jacksonville the storm produced a pressure of 989 mbar and winds of up to 48 mph (77 km/h). There, high tides resulted in flooding near waterways. At least one death was reported in the state.
- October 10, 1878 – Heavy amounts of precipitation was caused by a tropical storm making landfall near Apalachacola.
- October 21, 1878 – A hurricane paralleling the east coast of Florida produced winds in excess of 75 mph (120 km/h) along the coastline and rainfall peaking at 4.8 inches (122 mm) at Key West. Over a dozen ships were driven aground.
- October 16, 1879 – Pensacola was struck by a weak tropical storm which produced light winds and moderate rainfall peaking at 2.36 inches (60 mm) in Saint Marks.
- October 27, 1879 – A tropical storm hit near Cedar Key, producing gusty winds in Jacksonville but causing no known damage.

== 1880–1889 ==
- August 29, 1880 – 68 people died from a shipwreck as a result of a Category 2 hurricane making landfall just to the south of Cocoa Beach, Florida. Several other ships were washed ashore from Jupiter Inlet to the mouth of the St. Johns River, and another was damaged in the Gulf of Mexico after the hurricane crossed the state. In Cedar Key it is considered one of the worst hurricanes on record, with several buildings destroyed.
- September 8, 1880 – A tropical storm hit near Yankeetown, producing light amounts of rain and wind across the northern portion of the state.
- October 8, 1880 – The ninth storm and eighth hurricane of the season moved ashore just south of Yankeetown, though its impact, if any, is unknown.
- August 1, 1881 – Pensacola reported 15.95 inches (405 mm) of rainfall in association with a tropical storm that hit near the Alabama/Mississippi border.
- August 17, 1881 – A northeastward moving tropical storm passed just south of the Florida Keys and produced heavy rainfall and winds peaking at 28 mph (45 km/h) in Punta Russa.
- August 28, 1881 – Jacksonville experienced light winds from a hurricane that struck Savannah, Georgia.
- September 10, 1882 – The second hurricane of the season made landfall as a major hurricane at Pensacola, where it was considered to be among the most severe on record. Several boats were washed ashore along the Gulf of Mexico coastline. In and around Jacksonville, the strong winds greatly damaged the cotton crop and destroyed several buildings, killing five people.
- October 11, 1882 – A minimal hurricane hit near Yankeetown, causing moderate coastal flooding and heavy rainfall.
- September 10, 1883 – Jacksonville reported heavy rainfall in intervals and moderate winds from a hurricane paralleling the eastern coastline.
- September 10, 1884 – An offshore tropical storm which later became a hurricane produced higher than normal tides in northeastern Florida.
- August 24, 1885 – Light rainfall and gale-force winds were reported in Jacksonville in association with a hurricane paralleling the eastern coastline.
- August 30, September 21, and September 30, 1885 – Three tropical storms affected western Florida. Winds were not exceptionally strong, though the passage of the three storms contributed to a wet month in some portions of northern Florida, with precipitation accumulating to around 20 inches (500 mm) of rain.
- October 11, 1885 – The eighth storm of the season hit near the mouth of the Steinhatchee River, producing localized street flooding and moderate winds.
- June 21, 1886 – An unusual Category 2 hurricane in the month of June struck near St. Marks, producing strong winds gusts but little damage.
- June 30, 1886 – A week after the previous storm, another Category 2 hurricane hit the central Florida Panhandle, causing damage to numerous ships and capsizing several others. The winds of the hurricane destroyed dozens of houses and buildings, killing several people.
- July 19, 1886 – The fourth storm of the season made landfall near Yankeetown and produced gusty winds yet little damage.
- August 18, 1886 – The Indianola Hurricane passed just south of the Florida Keys, with Key West reporting a peak gust of 52 mph (84 km/h).
- July 27, 1887 – A hurricane hit near Pensacola and produced heavy rainfall peaking at 8 inches (203 mm) in Cedar Key. The rainfall, in combination with strong winds and rough seas, caused heavy damage to crops and roads.
- August 22, 1887 – A major hurricane paralleling the eastern coastline produced strong winds near the coast.
- October 20, 1887 – Heavy rainfall was reported in association with a hurricane crossing the northwestern Florida Panhandle.
- October 30, 1887 – The sixteenth storm of the season hit near Tampa, though its effects, if any, are unknown.
- August 16, 1888 – A major hurricane moved ashore on southeastern Florida, producing 2.02 inches (51 mm) of precipitation at Jupiter and a storm tide of 14 feet (4.3 m) at Miami. Damage is unknown.
- September 7, 1888 – 2.48 inches (63 mm) of rain was recorded in Fort Meade in association with a tropical storm striking near Palm Beach.
- September 23, 1888 – The sixth storm of the season formed just south of the Florida Keys before briefly moving onshore in the extreme southeastern portion of the state. Effects, if any, are unknown.
- October 11, 1888 – A Category 2 hurricane hit near Yankeetown. It produced high tides and moderate winds, and destroyed a hotel on Fort George Island.
- June 17, 1889 – The second storm of the season moved ashore near Yankeetown. Impact, if any, is unknown.
- September 23, 1889 – After weakening from hurricane status, a tropical storm made landfall on Pensacola, though its effects, if any, are unknown.
- October 6, 1889 – The final storm of the season struck extreme southern Florida after passing through the Florida Keys, causing no known effects.

== 1890–1899 ==
- August 24, 1891 – A minimal hurricane hit near Homestead, though due to lack of observations near the landfall location its impact in the state is unknown.
- October 7, 1891 – The seventh storm of the season struck Cape Sable and caused no known impact.
- October 9, 1891 – Shortly after becoming an extratropical cyclone, a storm crossed the state from Fort Myers to Cape Canaveral, producing light winds across the state.
- June 10, 1892 – A tropical storm which made landfall near Cape Sable dropped large amounts of precipitation across southern Florida.
- September 12, 1892 – Southeastern Louisiana was hit by a tropical storm, with winds in Pensacola reaching 47 mph (76 km/h).
- October 24, 1892 – Heavy rainfall was reported in southern Florida as a result of a tropical storm hitting Tampa Bay.
- June 16, 1893 – Saint Marks was struck by a tropical storm. Moderate winds and rainfall occurred throughout the northeastern portion of the state, including a total of 1.51 inches in Jacksonville.
- August 27, 1893 – The Sea Islands Hurricane paralleled the eastern coastline as a major hurricane, producing winds in excess of 75 mph (120 km/h) near the coast. The winds destroyed nine cottages in Mayport.
- October 2, 1893 – The Cheniere Caminada Hurricane made landfall on southeastern Louisiana, though its large and powerful circulation damaged Pensacola with high tides and winds.
- October 12, 1893 – A major hurricane paralleled the coastline about 60 miles (95 km) offshore. The storm tide was high enough that at low tide, it was at the position of the normal high tide mark. The tide caused street flooding in Saint Augustine, with heavy damage reported in Mayport.
- August 7, 1894 – The second storm of the season hit just west of the Florida/Alabama border. Pensacola reported 50 mph (80 km/h) winds in association with the storm, though damage, if any, is unknown.
- September 25, 1894 – A hurricane made landfall near Fort Myers. In Tampa, rainfall reached 13.78 inches (350 mm), causing coastal flooding in areas. Heavy damage was reported in several cities in northeastern Florida.
- October 9, 1894 – A major hurricane moved ashore near Pensacola, producing high tides and heavy rainfall.
- October 2, 1895 – Heavy rainfall occurred in southern Florida as a result of a tropical storm passing a short distance to the south of the state.
- October 16, 1895 – Naples was struck by a tropical storm whose impact is unknown.
- October 22, 1895 – An offshore hurricane caused high tides and strong winds in southeastern Florida.
- July 7, 1896 – A Category 2 hurricane hit near Pensacola. There, strong winds destroyed the roofs of about 35 houses and wrecked nine boats. Damage in the city is estimated at over $100,000 (1896 USD, $2.6 million 2008 USD).
- September 29, 1896 – The fourth storm made landfall as a major hurricane on Yankeetown with a pressure of 960 mbar. Strong winds downed hundreds of trees and caused severe damage amounting to $1.5 million (1896 USD, $36 million 2006 USD). Multiple deaths were reported in the state.
- October 9, 1896 – A tropical storm hit near Fort Myers, though its impact is unknown.
- September 11, 1897 – An anemometer in Pensacola reported winds of 43 mph (69 km/h) from a hurricane in the Gulf of Mexico. It is unknown if the hurricane caused damage in the state.
- September 21, 1897 – The third storm of the season moved ashore just north of Fort Myers and produced heavy rainfall, including a 24‑hour total of 6.56 inches (166 mm) in Tampa.

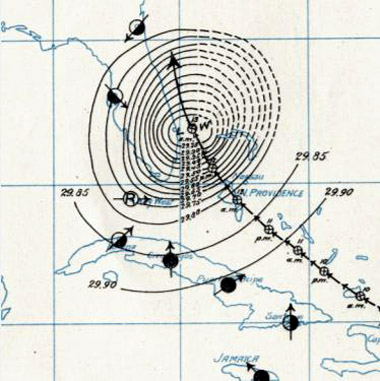
Surface weather analysis for the San Ciriaco Hurricane on August 13, 1899

- August 2, 1898 – A tropical storm made landfall near Palm Beach, crossed the state, and intensified in the Gulf of Mexico before hitting Apalachicola as a hurricane. Three barges, four tug boats, and several boats were destroyed, and numerous wharves and dwellings were damaged as a result of the storm. Four people died from the shipwrecks.
- October 2, 1898 – A Category 4 hurricane hit southern Georgia, causing severe damage in the extreme northeastern portion of the state. A storm surge of 12 feet flooded and damaged several buildings along the Fernandina waterfront. A conservative estimate for total damage in the state is $500,000 (1898 USD, $13 million 2008 USD).
- August 1, 1899 – After previously moving across southwestern Florida, a Category 2 hurricane struck Apalachicola. The storm caused $575,000 in boat, crop, and property damage (1899 USD, $14.8 million 2008 USD), and also resulted in six fatalities.
- August 13, 1899 – The San Ciriaco Hurricane paralleled the eastern coastline, producing moderate winds and light damage.
- October 5, 1899 – A tropical storm hit near Tampa and sank a schooner off Fernandina Beach.
- October 30, 1899 – A hurricane paralleled the eastern Florida coastline, with several locations near the coast recording strong winds in association with the storm. No cases of serious damage were reported.

== Monthly statistics ==
Number of recorded storms affecting Florida
Month	Number of storms
June	10
July	6
August	35
September	56
October	53
November	1

== Deadly storms ==
The following is a list of hurricanes with known deaths in the state. Several other hurricanes killed an unknown number of people in Florida, and multiple others left several missing.

Year	Number of deaths
1781	2,000
1622	1,090
Around 1553	700
1553	<700
1559	500
1559	~500
1683	496
1563	284
1880	68
1846	50
1758	40
1838	38
1843	14
1837	8
1899	6
1882	5
1898	4
1878	1+

== See also ==
- List of Atlantic hurricanes
