= Benito Viñes =

Jesuit priest (1837–1893)

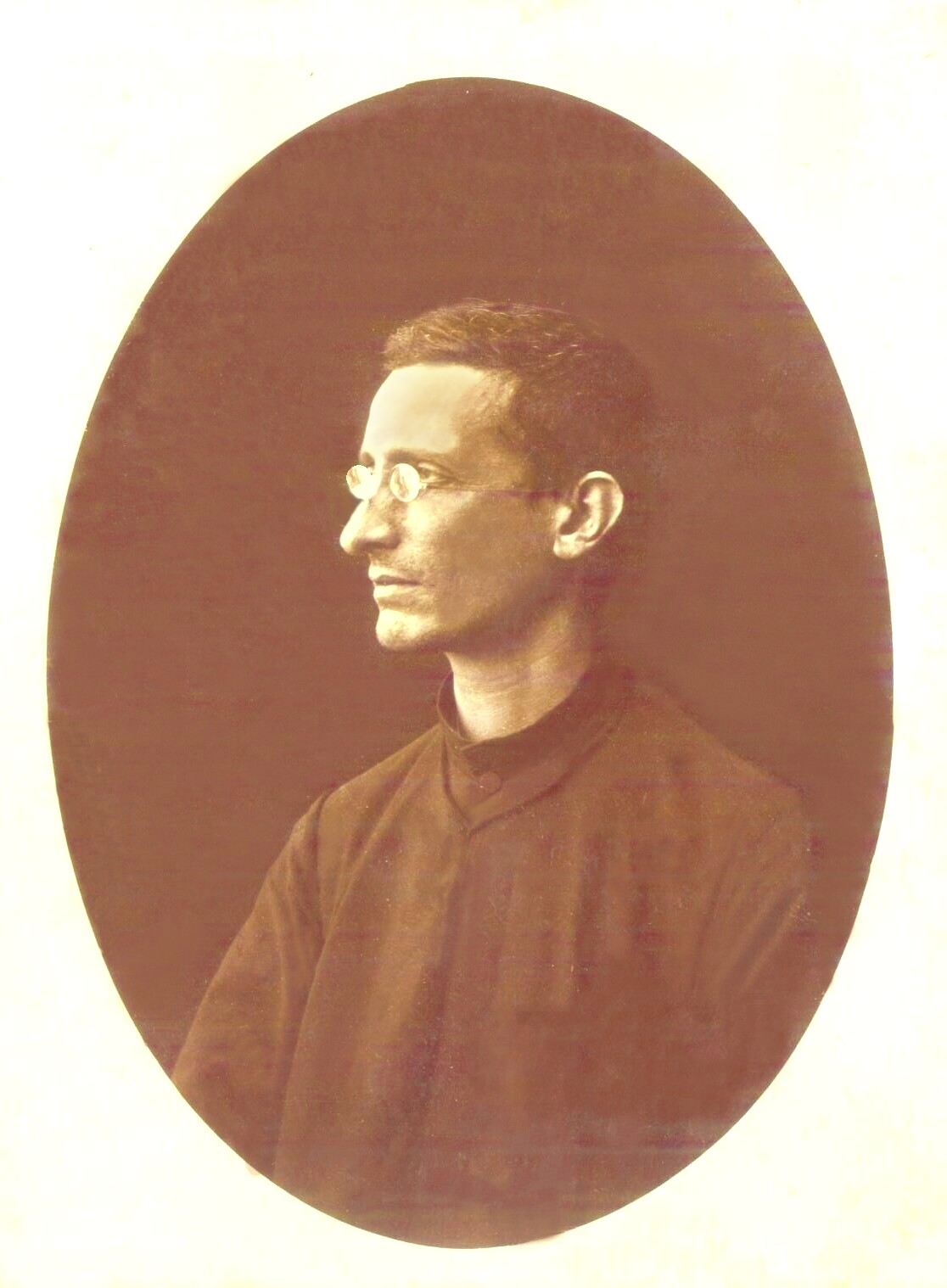
- Born: September 19, 1837; Poboleda (Spain)
- Died: July 23, 1893 (aged 55); Havana (Spanish Empire)
- Occupation: Priest; meteorologist

Benito Viñes (named Benet Vinyes in Catalan, his mother tongue; 1837–1893) was a Jesuit cleric at Belen Jesuit Preparatory School during the 19th century in Havana, Cuba. He became well known for his studies of hurricanes. He was the Director of the Magnetical and Meteorological Observatory of the Royal College of Belen in Havana and the author of Practical Hints in Regard to the West Indian Hurricanes, a work which was translated into English by the US Navy and issued by the United States Hydrographic Office.

== Early life and education ==
Benito Carlos José Viñes Martorell, also known as Benet Vinyes in Catalan, was born on September 19, 1837, in Poboleda, Tarragona, which is within Spain's Catalonia region. Viñes moved to the provincial capital city of Tarragona at age nine. After being accepted into the Jesuit Order in 1856, he completed his novitiate and studied mathematics, natural sciences, philosophy, physics, and theology. Viñes completed his studies and was ordained in France on June 21, 1869, due to Jesuits being expelled from Spain. He remained in France until the following year, when the Jesuit Order appointed him the director of the Real Observatorio del Colegio de Belén in Havana, Cuba.

== Career ==
On March 7, 1870, Viñes arrived in Havana, Cuba, to begin his career as director of the Real Observatorio del Colegio de Belén. According to Radio Reloj, he seemed interested in researching tropical cyclones almost immediately upon his arrival, studying the institution's meteorological records, which had been kept since around the time of its establishment in 1854. Later in 1870, two hurricanes severely impacted Cuba, particularly one in the first half of October, which caused at least 800 deaths and extensive damage, especially in Matanzas. Consequently, Viñes began studying those hurricanes and continued to do so with previous storms. This included researching their atmospheric circulations, movements, and organization. Prior to the 1870s, little research had been conducted on tropical cyclogenesis beyond the works of James Pollard Espy, William Charles Redfield, and William Reid.

By the end of 1870, Viñes released a short paper called Huracanes del 7 y el 19 de octubre de 1870, which described both tropical cyclones to strike Cuba in October. About a year later, he published another study entitled Memoria de la Marcha Regular o periódica e Irregular del Barómetro en La Habana desde 1858 a 1871 inclusive, a paper analyzing storms and barometer data in Havana from 1858 to 1871. This included a hurricane in 1865 that deroofed the observatory shortly after bringing calmness to the city that lasted for approximately half an hour while the eye passed over.

On September 11, 1875, Viñes very likely issued the first-ever hurricane warning for a cyclone approaching the island by publishing his forecast in newspapers and alerting Havana's harbormaster. The Atlantic Oceanographic and Meteorological Laboratory noted that "by 1875, he knew to look at cloud motions at different levels of the atmosphere and at ocean swell and waves to offer clues about the existence of an approaching hurricane. And, having studied prior storm tracks, he could guess at the likely course of any threatening cyclones." Additionally, he had also received telegraphic reports from Puerto Rico and the Virgin Islands about the hurricane impacting those regions.

Viñes also developed a network of weather observation posts across the Caribbean Sea beginning in 1876, which would then send their data to Havana via telegraph. By 1888, 20 stations existed and submitted weather reports regularly. However, only four of these weather observation sites - on Barbados, Cuba (at Santiago de Cuba), Jamaica, Saint Thomas, functioned consistently in 1891 due to financial issues or inadequate support from the government. In 1885, Viñes authored a book entitled Practical Hints in Regard to the West Indian Hurricanes, a work which was translated into English by the US Navy and issued by the United States Hydrographic Office. Viñes died on July 23, 1893, in Havana.

== See also ==
- History of Atlantic hurricane warnings
- List of Belen Jesuit Preparatory School people
- List of Catholic clergy scientists
