= Antonio Caballero y Fernández de Rodas =

Spanish colonial governor and general (1816–1876)

General Antonio Caballero y Fernández de Rodas
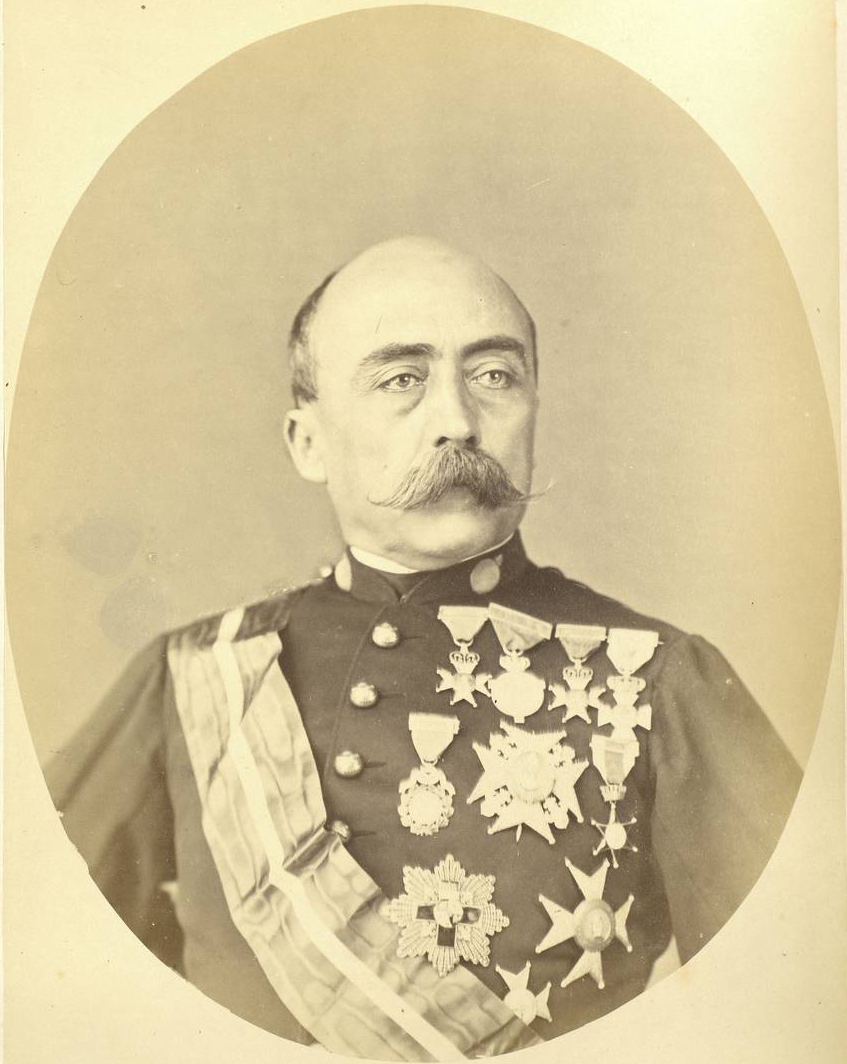
- Born: April 3, 1816; Madrid, Community of Madrid, Spain
- Died: December 26, 1876 (aged 60); Madrid, Community of Madrid, Spain
- Military career
- Allegiance: (Restoration (Spain)) Spain
- Branch: Spanish Army
- Service years: 1833 — 1868
- Conflicts: First Carlist War; Hispano-Moroccan War; Spanish Glorious Revolution: Battle of Alcolea; Ten Years' War; Third Carlist War

Captain General of Cuba
- In office June 28, 1869 – December 13, 1870
- Monarch: Amadeo I
- Prime Minister: Juan Prim
- Minister of Overseas: Juan Bautista Topete (as acting); Manuel Becerra y Bermúdez; Segismundo Moret
- Preceded by: Felipe Ginovés del Espinar (as acting)
- Succeeded by: Blas Villate

Antonio Caballero y Fernández de Rodas (1816-1876) was a 19th-Century Spanish general who was notable for his participation in the Ten Years' War and the Spanish Glorious Revolution.

== Biography ==
One of the first fronts on which he intervened in was the First Carlist War, where he has already aroused the interest of his superiors. In 1854 he was part of the Vicalvarada and distinguished himself by joining the Liberal Union. In the days of Leopoldo O'Donnell he was promoted to brigadier and took part in the Hispano-Moroccan War. In 1861 he put an end to the Loja insurrection. After intervening in the war in Morocco, he returns to Madrid and had an argument with Nicolás María Rivero that would end in a duel. This circumstance did not favor him at all as he ended up being exiled to the Canary Islands, where they also sent General Francisco Serrano and others.

=== Little War and Spanish Glorious Revolution ===
With the Duke de la Torre and other generals exiled to the Canary Islands, he returned to the peninsula in September 1868 to join the Glorious Revolution against Isabel II. He was one of the signers of the Cádiz Manifesto in September 1868 and participated in the Battle of Alcolea, in which he was one of its most important generals. At the head of a division he contributed to the triumph of the uprising troops. He was promoted on his merits to lieutenant general.

Appointed director general of the Infantry, in July 1869 he was sworn in as Captain General of Cuba, where the first independence insurrection had broken out shortly before. He traveled to Cuba together with the new mayor, José Emilio de Santos, with the mandate to pacify the island and end corruption in the administration, but it only took him a year to return to Spain. In 1872 he was elected senator for the provinces of Almería and Córdoba, opting for the representation of the former.

In 1873 he participated in the Third Carlist War on April 23 together with Generals Serrano and Topete in order to prevent the proclamation of the federal Republic, the failure of the movement led him to flee in disguise but was captured in Torrelodones, although thanks to a safe-conduct from Estanislao Figueras he was released. Caballero died in Madrid in 1876
