= 1878 Atlantic hurricane season =

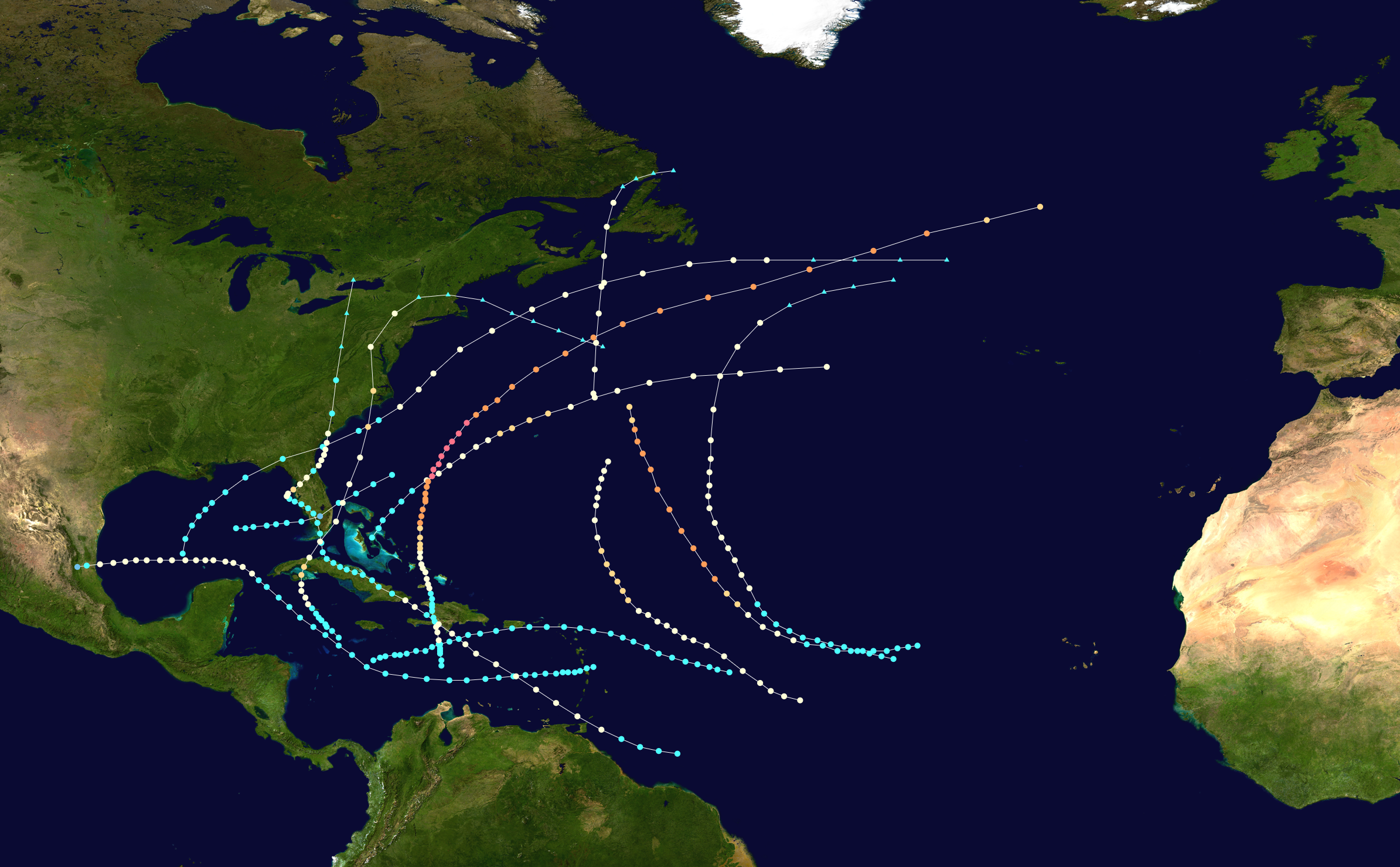
- Season summary map

Seasonal boundaries
- First system formed: July 1, 1878
- Last system dissipated: December 2, 1878

Strongest storm
- Name: Seven
  - Maximum winds: 140 mph (220 km/h) (1-minute sustained)
  - Lowest pressure: 938 mbar (hPa; 27.7 inHg)

Seasonal statistics
- Total storms: 12
- Hurricanes: 10
- Major hurricanes (Cat. 3+): 2
- Total fatalities: >161
- Total damage: > $3.38 million (1878 USD)

The 1878 Atlantic hurricane season featured twelve known tropical cyclones, tied with 1886 and 1893 for the second-most active season in the latter half of the 19th century. Of the twelve tropical storms, eight strengthened into hurricanes, while two of those intensified into major hurricanes. (Note: A major hurricane is a storm that ranks as Category 3 or higher on the Saffir–Simpson hurricane wind scale.) However, in the absence of modern satellite and other remote-sensing technologies, only storms that affected populated land areas or encountered ships at sea were recorded, so the actual total could be higher. An undercount bias of zero to six tropical cyclones per year between 1851 and 1885 and zero to four per year between 1886 and 1910 has been estimated.

Of the known 1878 cyclones, both the third and fourth systems were first documented in 1995 by meteorologists José Fernández-Partagás and Henry F. Díaz, who also proposed large changes to the known tracks of the second, seventh, and eighth storms. Further analysis in the early 21st century by the Atlantic hurricane reanalysis project extended the duration of the third system by one day and identified major track changes for the fifth system. However, climate researcher Michael Chenoweth authored a reanalysis study, published in 2014, which concluded that the 1878 season featured a total of seventeen tropical cyclones, with the addition of five undocumented or previously excluded systems from the official hurricane database (HURDAT). Chenoweth also proposed some alterations to the track and intensity of each existing storm. However, these changes have yet to be incorporated into HURDAT.

Seasonal activity began by July 1, when stormy conditions associated with the first system started to impact Florida. All three known cyclones in August intensified into hurricanes and impacted land. Another three systems formed in September and each of them also strengthened into a hurricane. The last of the three, the seventh overall, became the most intense cyclone of the season, peaking as a Category 4 hurricane on the present-day Saffir–Simpson scale. Prior to this, the storm struck Haiti, leading to an unknown number of deaths when a brigantine capsized. Earlier in September, the fifth cyclone inflicted more than $919,000 (1878 USD) throughout its path and killed at least 60 people, with the dead rumored in the hundreds across the Caribbean, particularly in Haiti. (Note: All values in 1878 USD unless otherwise noted.) In mid-October, the season's eighth storm drowned 27 people offshore New England. Later that month, the eleventh cyclone, the Gale of 1878, rendered substantial storm surge and wind damage throughout the Eastern United States, with 71 deaths and more than $2.46 million in damage. A record-tying five hurricanes existed in the month of October. The twelfth and final known system, which drowned three people in Puerto Rico, was last noted south of Jamaica on December 2.

== Season summary ==
The Atlantic hurricane database (HURDAT) recognizes twelve tropical cyclones for 1878 in the Atlantic basin, the highest number in a single season until 1887 and tied with 1886 and 1893 for the second-highest in the latter half of the 19th century. Ten storms attained hurricane status, with winds of 74 mph (118 km/h) or greater, while two of those intensified into major hurricane. The seventh hurricane peaked as a Category 4 hurricane on the present-day Saffir–Simpson scale with maximum sustained winds up to 140 mph (220 km/h) and a minimum atmospheric pressure of 938 mbar (27.7 inHg), making it a major hurricane. Meteorologists José Fernández-Partagás and Henry F. Diaz first documented the third and fourth cyclones in 1995, while also significantly modifying the tracks of the second, seven, and eighth storms. In the early 21st century, Atlantic hurricane reanalysis project extended the duration of the third system by one day and implemented a major adjustment to the fifth system's track based on a study by Cuban meteorologist Ramón Pérez Suárez. However, a 2014 study by climate researcher Michael Chenoweth recommended the addition of five new cyclones and some alterations to the track and intensity of each existing storm. Chenoweth's study utilizes a more extensive collection of newspapers and ship logs, as well as late 19th century weather maps for the first time, in comparison to previous reanalysis projects. However, Chenoweth's proposals have yet to be incorporated into HURDAT.

Seasonal activity began by July 1, the day when Florida began reporting stormy conditions associated with the season's first cyclone. After this storm was last noted on July 3, more than a month passed before the Lesser Antilles detected the season's second cyclone on August 8. Three systems formed in August, all of which strengthened into hurricanes; each also impacted land. Another three systems formed in September and each of them also strengthened into a hurricane. The first of the three, the fifth cyclone, caused more than $919,000 in losses at least 60 deaths from the Caribbean to the United States and Canada. Some sources suggest that hundreds of fatalities occurred in the Greater and Lesser Antilles, particularly in Haiti. Prior to becoming a Category 4 hurricane, the seventh hurricane struck Haiti as a Category 1 hurricane, compounding the impacts of the fifth storm. With the seventh cyclone existing until at least October 8 and four additional hurricanes forming later that month, this was the most active October on record in terms of number of hurricanes, tied with 1870, 1950, and 2010. The season's eighth storm drowned 27 people offshore New England in mid-October, while the eleventh cyclone, also known as the Gale of 1878, rendered substantial storm surge and wind damage throughout the Eastern United States near the end of the month, with over 71 deaths and more than $2.46 million in damage. After the eleventh storm transitioned into an extratropical cyclone on October 23, the twelfth and final system was first detected east of the Lesser Antilles on November 25. Causing three deaths in Puerto Rico, the cyclone was last noted over the Caribbean Sea south of Jamaica on December 2. Collectively, the storms of the 1878 Atlantic hurricane season caused more than 161 fatalities and over $3.38 million in damage.

The season's activity was reflected with an accumulated cyclone energy (ACE) rating of 181, tied with 1887 for the second highest total of the 19th century and behind only 1893. October alone accounted for a value of 87.8, which remains the all-time highest total in the month of October since HURDAT records began. ACE is a metric used to express the energy used by a tropical cyclone during its lifetime. Therefore, a storm with a longer duration will have higher values of ACE. It is only calculated at six-hour increments in which specific tropical systems are either at or above sustained wind speeds of 39 mph (63 km/h), which is the threshold for tropical storm intensity. Thus, tropical depressions are not included here.

== Systems ==
=== Tropical Storm One ===
- Tropical storm (SSHWS)
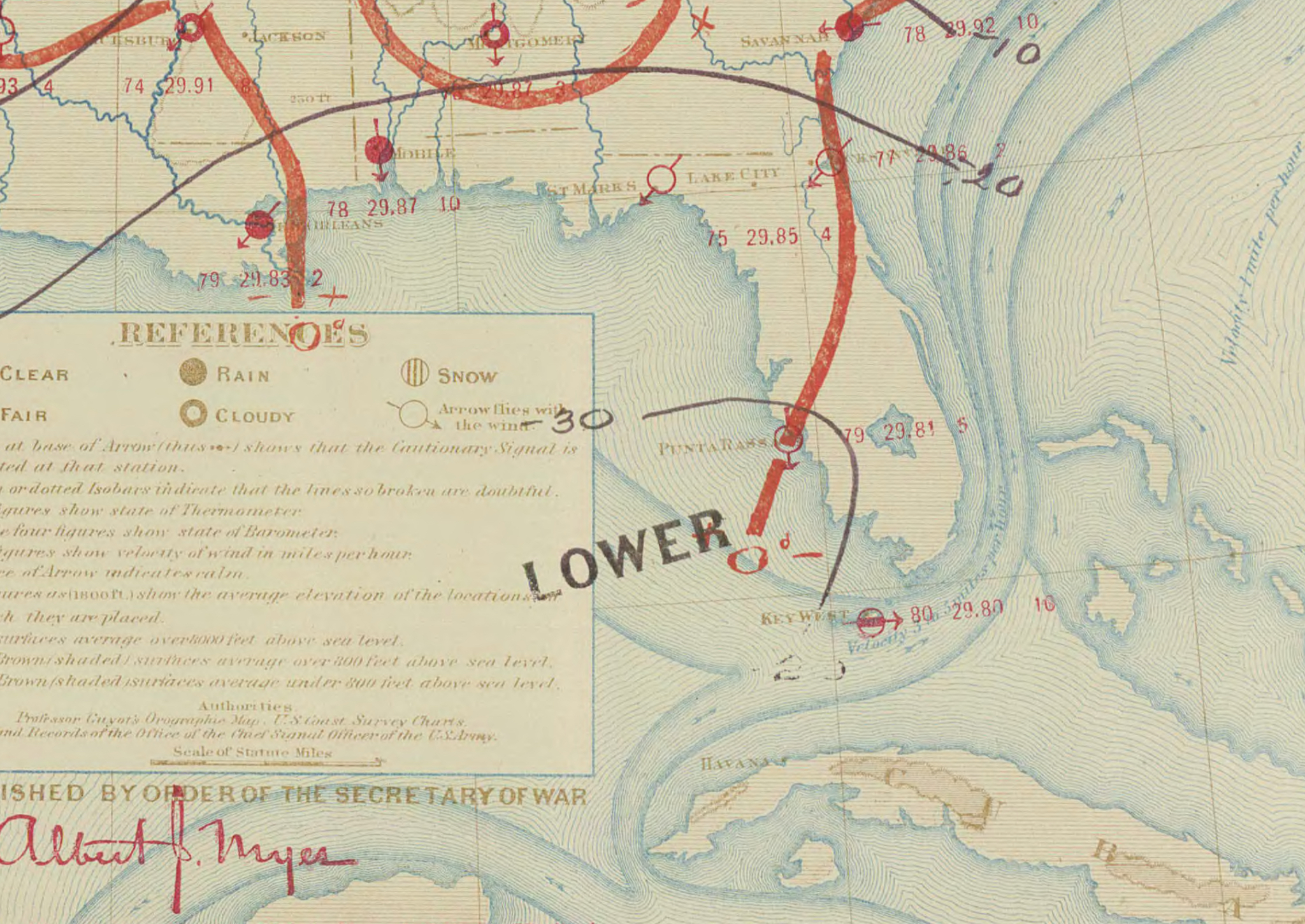
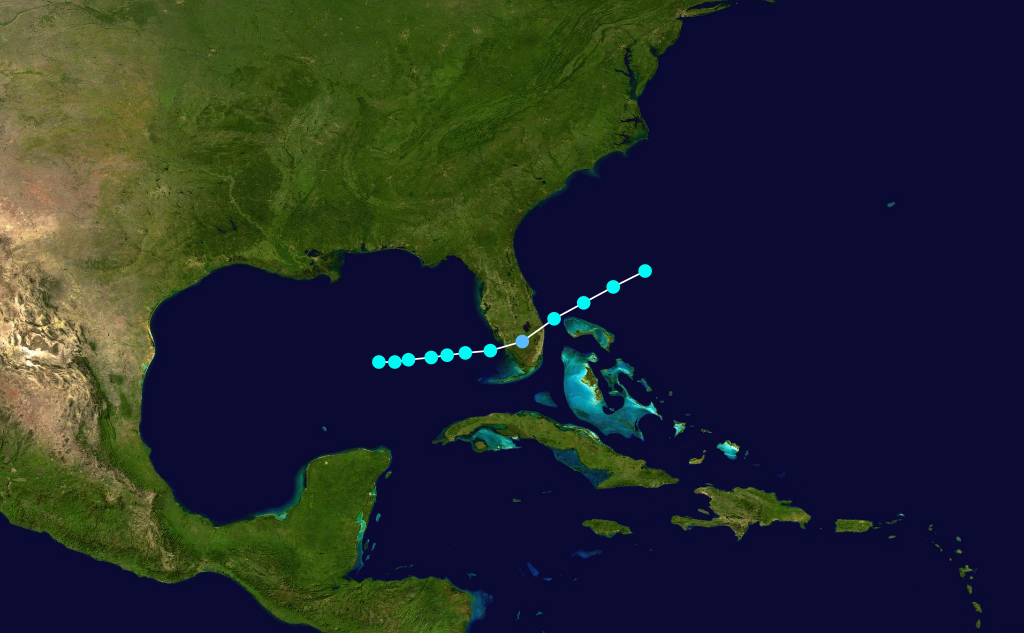
- Duration: July 1 – July 3
- Peak intensity: 45 mph (75 km/h) (1-min); 1008 mbar (hPa)

Parts of Florida first experienced frequent rain, easterly wind, and decreasing atmospheric pressures on July 1, leading the Atlantic hurricane reanalysis project to initiate the track for this storm approximately 280 mi (450 km) west-northwest of Dry Tortugas. The storm made landfall near Marco Island, Florida, on July 2 with sustained winds of 45 mph (75 km/h); Punta Rassa, recorded a minimum pressure of 1,008 mb (29.77 inHg) that afternoon. The storm likely briefly weakened to a tropical depression over Florida before emerging into the Atlantic late on July 2 and quickly regained tropical storm status early on July 3. However, the cyclone was last noted several hours later.

Climate scientist Michael Chenoweth proposed that this system formed over the Straits of Florida and initially moved northwestward, passing through the Florida Keys. The storm then turned northeastward and made landfall near Marco Island, but may have dissipated over present-day Palm Beach County instead of emerging into the Atlantic. Key West, Florida, registered a wind of 36 mph (58 km/h). Rainy weather with frequent easterly gales extended northward through South Carolina. On July 3, easterly gales and rainy weather prevailed along the Atlantic coast as far north as Cape Hatteras. Smithville, North Carolina, registered a maximum wind of 38 mph (61 km/h) from the east.

=== Hurricane Two ===
- Category 1 hurricane (SSHWS)
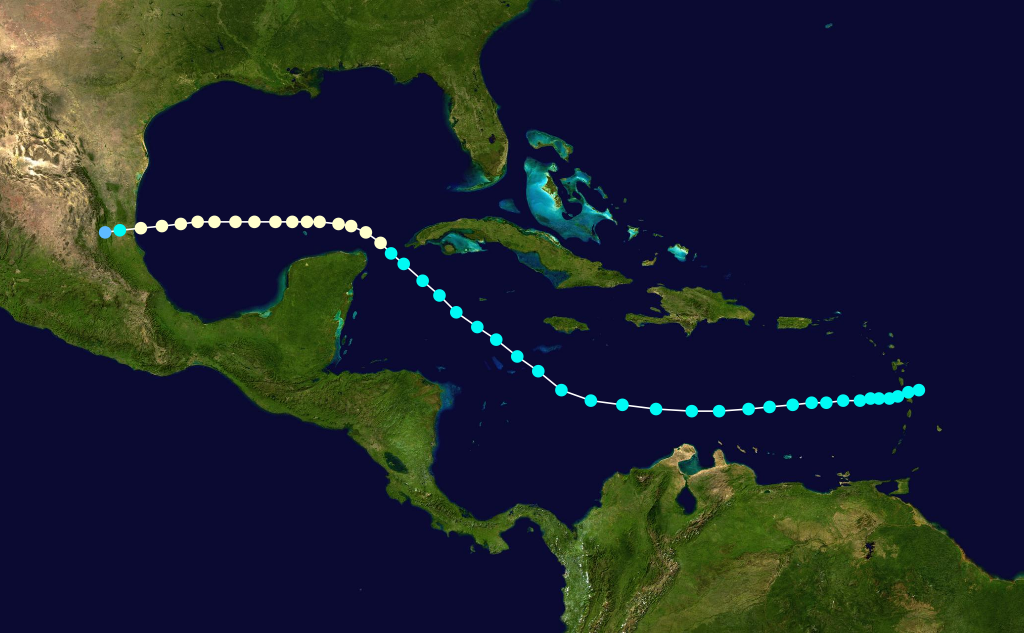
- Duration: August 8 – August 19
- Peak intensity: 80 mph (130 km/h) (1-min);

With Guadeloupe reporting squalls and falling atmospheric pressures on August 8, the official track of this cyclone begins just east of the Martinique that day. The system moved generally westward across the Caribbean Sea and then turned northwestward on August 12 south of Jamaica. Shortly after crossing the Yucatán Channel and entering the Gulf of Mexico, the storm likely intensified into a hurricane with maximum sustained winds of 80 mph (130 km/h) early on August 15, based on reports from the bark Padang, which wrecked near Sisal, Yucatán. The storm moved westward across the Gulf of Mexico, and is estimated to have maintained hurricane status until making landfall in Mexico between La Pesca and Tampico in the state of Tamaulipas on August 18. The hurricane rapidly dissipated over Mexico by the next day.

Chenoweth argued that this storm did not exist until August 14, when it was located over the northwestern Caribbean. Additionally, the cyclone moved mostly west-northwest, crossing the northeastern Yucatán Peninsula and later making another landfall near La Pesca, Tamaulipas. The storm caused only minimal in the Lesser Antilles, with Guadeloupe experiencing squalls and barometric pressures falling to 1,008 mbar (29.8 inHg). Martinique recorded 1.97 in (50.1 mm) of precipitation, although this occurred on August 11, making its relation to the cyclone uncertain. In Mexico, Campeche observed heavy rainfall, leading to flooding in the city of the same name. However, Campeche governor Marcelino Castilla and other officials quickly provided disaster relief. Parts of the state of Veracruz reported strong winds, uprooting trees and destroying homes in Tantima, while heavy rains there turned streams into torrents. At Ozuluama, high winds severely damaged or destroyed homes and crops, particularly bananas.

=== Hurricane Three ===
- Category 1 hurricane (SSHWS)
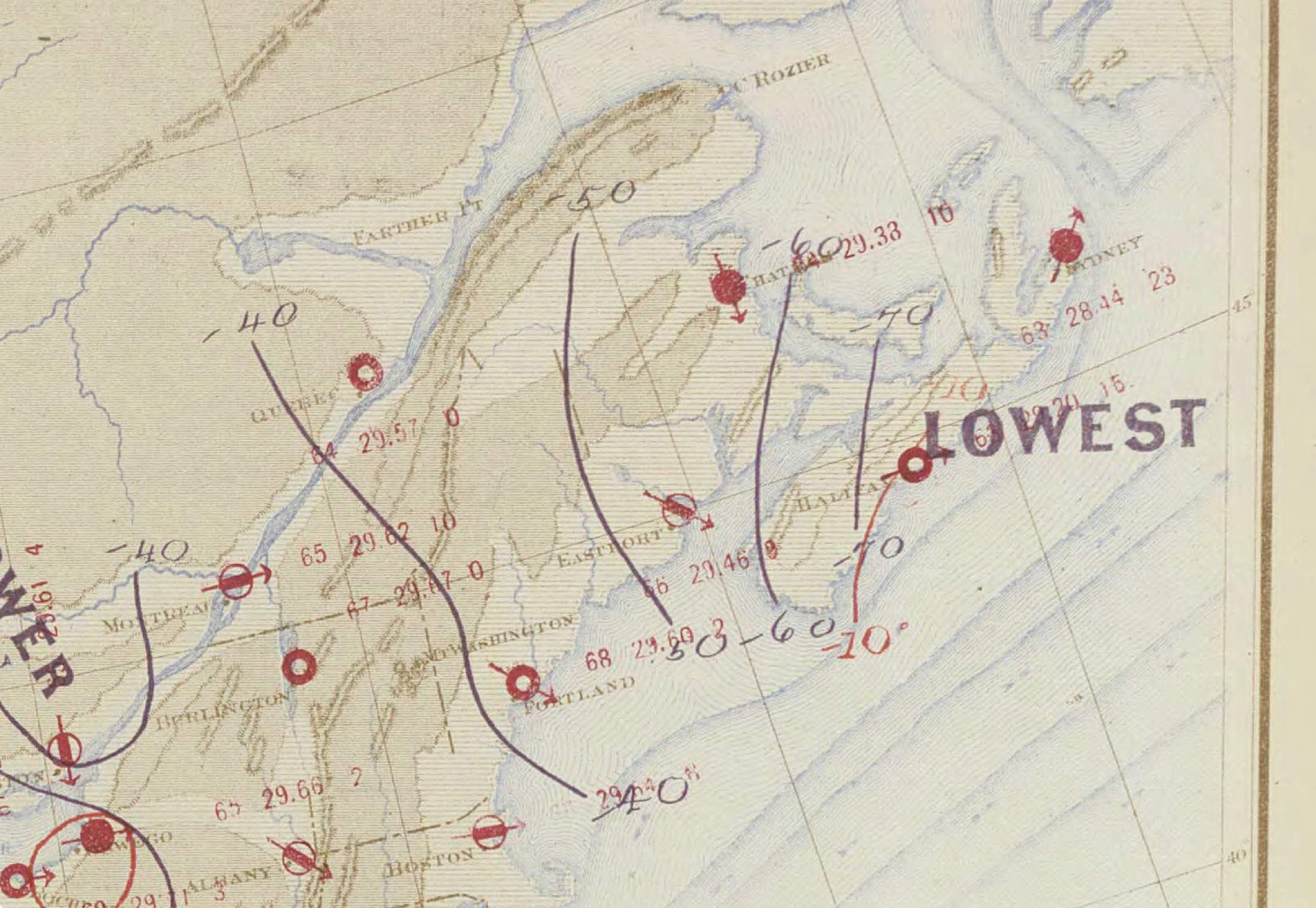
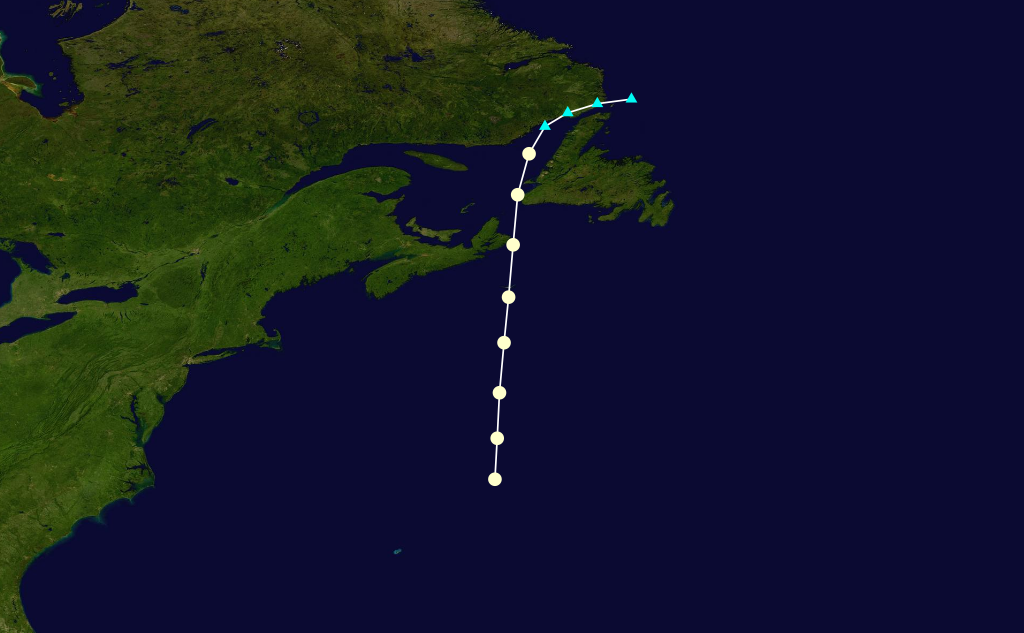
- Duration: August 19 – August 20
- Peak intensity: 90 mph (150 km/h) (1-min); 963 mbar (hPa)

A Category 1 hurricane was first observed in western Atlantic, northeast of Bermuda, on August 19 by the bark Arvid. Moving rapidly north-northeastward, the storm grazed Nova Scotia early on the following day. Sydney observed a barometric pressure as low as 963 mbar (28.4 inHg), forming the basis of the hurricane's estimated maximum sustained wind speed of 90 mph (150 km/h). After also brushing Newfoundland on August 20, the hurricane transitioned into an extratropical cyclone in the Gulf of St. Lawrence several hours later. The storm and its remnants brought heavy rainfall to parts of Atlantic Canada and high winds to eastern Nova Scotia. Chenoweth postulated that this cyclone formed southeast of North Carolina on August 16 and transitioned into an extratropical cyclone just offshore the south coast of Newfoundland late on August 20.

=== Hurricane Four ===
- Category 2 hurricane (SSHWS)
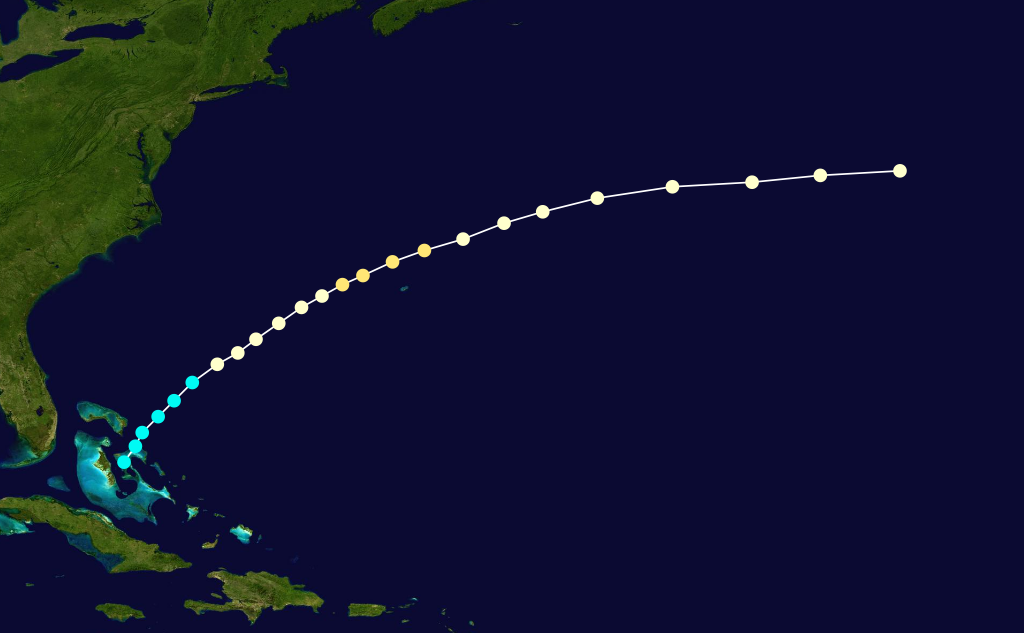
- Duration: August 25 – August 30
- Peak intensity: 105 mph (165 km/h) (1-min); 972 mbar (hPa)

Due to ships in the vicinity of the Bahamas reporting severe gales and a barometric pressure as low as 1,002 mbar (29.6 inHg), HURDAT initiated the track of this cyclone just south of New Providence on August 25. It moved to the northeast early in its duration, striking Eleuthera shortly thereafter before entering the open Atlantic. By August 26, the cyclone strengthened into a hurricane. Further intensification occurred based on the brig Brittania observing a barometric pressure of 972 mbar (28.7 inHg), leading the Atlantic hurricane reanalysis project to estimate the storm reached Category 2 status and peaked with winds of 105 mph (165 km/h) on August 28. That day, the hurricane passed within 90 mi (145 km) of Bermuda. Only slight weakening occurred as the storm turned more eastward before being last seen on August 30 approximately 815 mi (1,310 km) southeast of Cape Race, Newfoundland.

Chenoweth's reanalysis study argued that this cyclone instead formed on August 23 just east of the Florida Keys and moved slowly northeastward for much of its duration, crossing the Abaco Islands in the Bahamas and passing much closer to Bermuda. The storm was last noted by Chenoweth on August 31. In the Bahamas, the cyclone caused severe crop losses at Green Turtle Cay, but no other damage on that island. Additionally, Hope Town reported minor damage to sugarcane fields, while substantial impacts occurred to banana and orange trees at Marsh Harbour. Bermuda experienced hurricane-force winds, inflicting extensive damage to floating docks at the Royal Naval Dockyard, Bermuda. A number of roads were also blocked by falling trees.

=== Hurricane Five ===
- Category 2 hurricane (SSHWS)
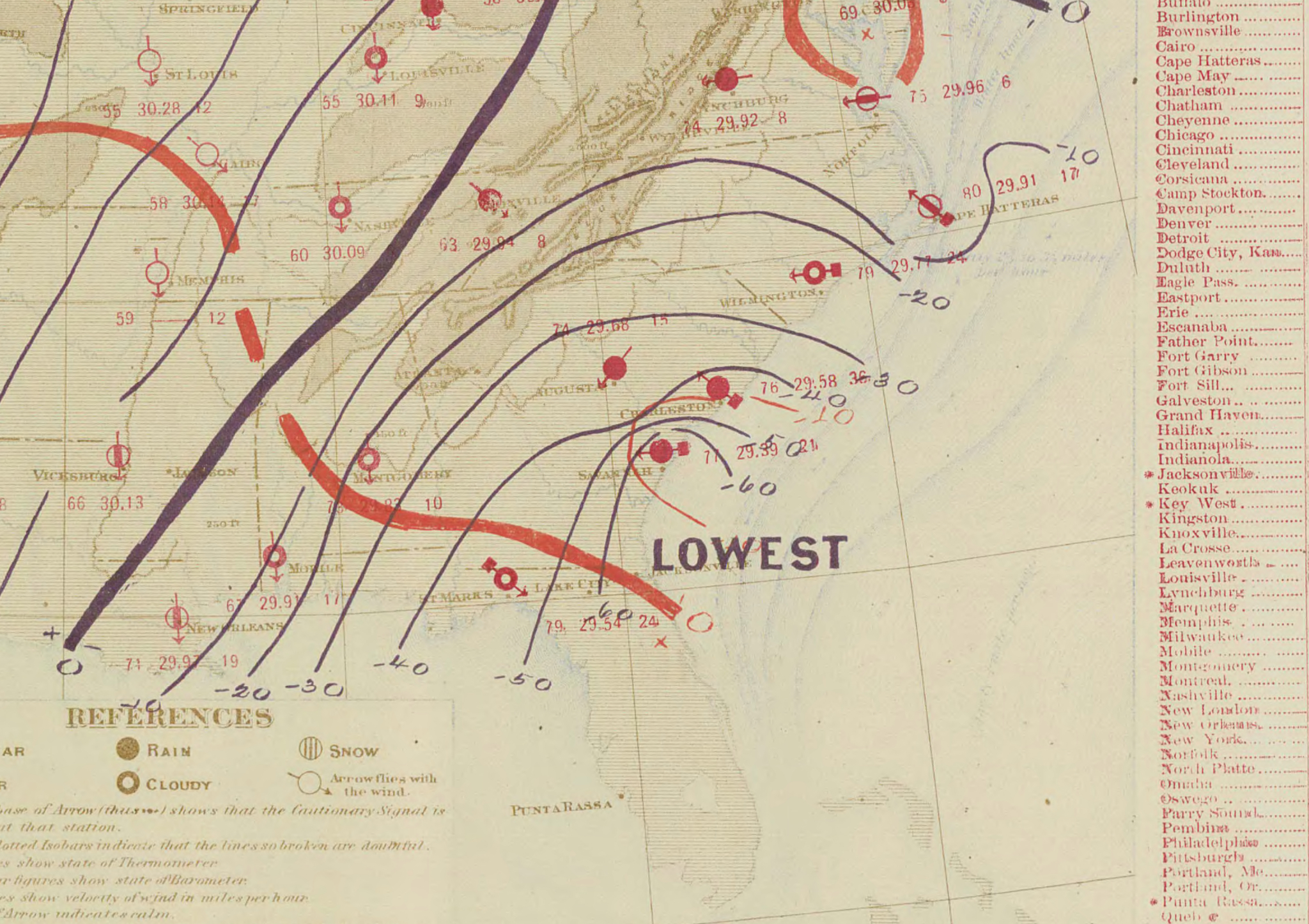
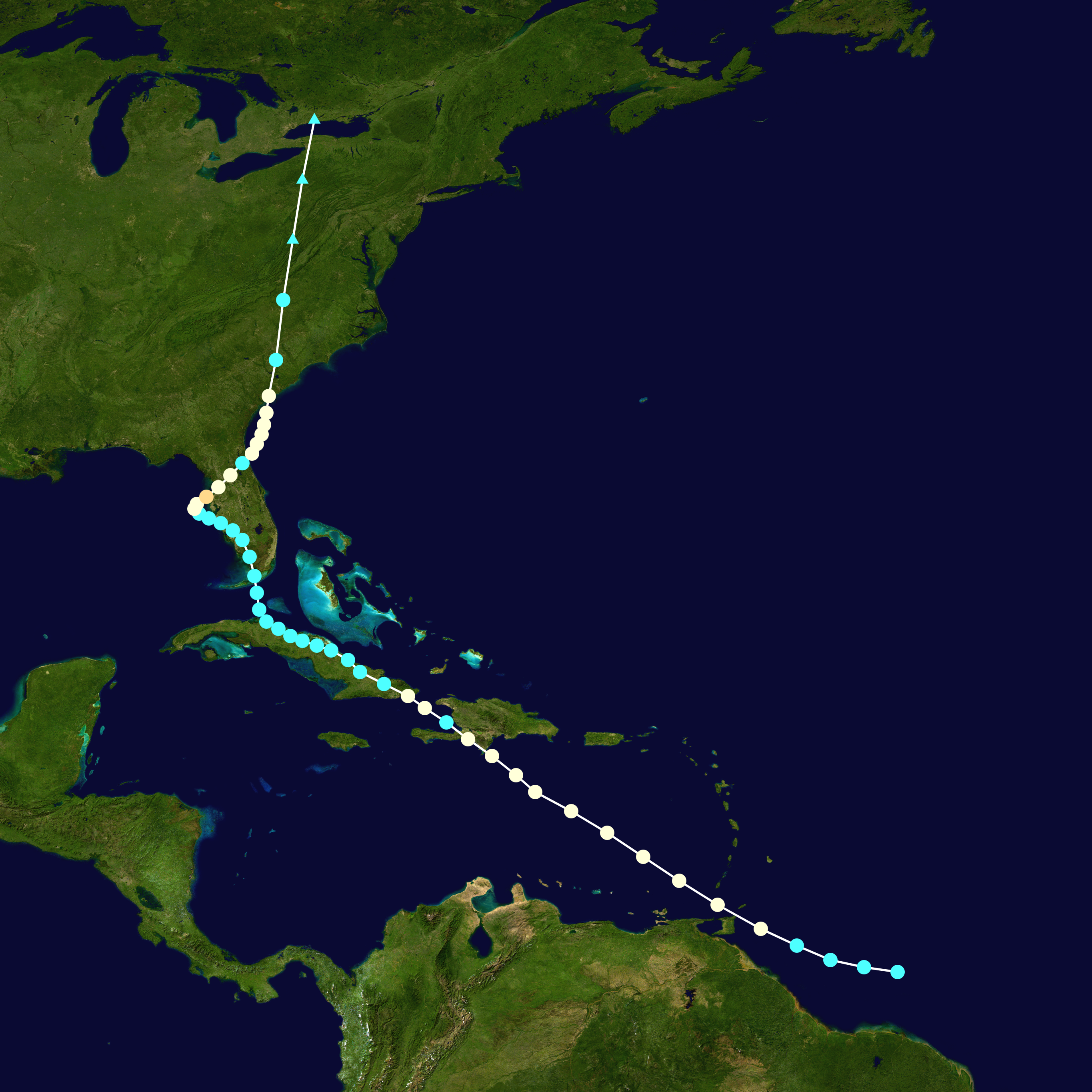
- Duration: September 1 – September 13
- Peak intensity: 105 mph (165 km/h) (1-min); 970 mbar (hPa)

The track for this system begins about 180 mi (290 km) north of Suriname on September 1, the same day that Trinidad first reported stormy conditions. It moved to the west-northwest, becoming a hurricane on September 2 before passing between Trinidad and Tobago. Trekking northwestward across the Caribbean, striking southern Haiti and far southeastern Cuba on September 4 as a hurricane, briefly weakening to a tropical storm between both landfalls. The hurricane quickly weakened to a tropical storm again and moved parallel to the north coast of Cuba. By September 7, the cyclone emerged into the Straits of Florida and moved northward, striking near Duck Key, Florida, around 21:00 UTC and then mainland Monroe County early the next day. The system then curved northwestward and emerged into the Gulf of Mexico early on September 9. Significant intensification ensued as the storm recurved northeastward, with the cyclone estimated to have become a Category 2 hurricane with winds of 105 mph (165 km/h) and a barometric pressure of 970 mbar (29 inHg) prior to striking near Bayport, Florida, at 11:00 UTC on September 10. The system weakened to a tropical storm early the next day, but became a Category 1 hurricane again upon emerging into the Atlantic near St. Augustine. Curving north-northeastward, the storm made its final landfall near Edisto Beach, South Carolina, around 12:00 UTC on September 12. By early the next day, the system became an extratropical cyclone over West Virginia, before dissipating several hours later over Ontario.

Chenoweth's reanalysis study suggested that this storm scraped Haiti's Tiburon Peninsula and made only one landfall on Florida's mainland, near Cape Romano early on September 8 as a Category 2 hurricane. Trinidad recorded 7 in (180 mm) of rain and sustained winds of 81 mph (130 km/h) at Port of Spain. The storm destroyed some homes, warehouses, bridges, wharves, and roadways and toppled many trees, a few of which damaged a post office and bank. Nearly all cocoa crops were lost, and two drownings occurred. Extensive impacts and at least 16 deaths occurred in Haiti. At Jacmel, a river rose significantly, sweeping away homes and about 500,000 lb (230,000 kg) of wood, causing about $60,000 in damage. Cavaillon and Les Cayes also suffered especially hard. The former "exists no longer", according to communications received by the Reading Times and Dispatch. In Les Cayes, the hurricane destroyed 434 homes and a bridge, military facility, courthouse, schoolhouse, and prison. Multiple sources note that hundreds of deaths occurred in the Caribbean, particularly in Haiti. Bimini in the Bahamas reported the loss of hundreds of bunches of bananas, the destruction of two buildings, and damage to many homes. In Central Florida, the cyclone flooded the area near Fort Basinger, along the Kissimmee River in present-day Okeechobee County. Very heavy rainfall along its path affected the Florida peninsula, with one death in the state. Several ships wrecked along the east coast of Florida between Cape Canaveral and Amelia Island. Heavy crop losses, particularly to rice, occurred in Georgia near Savannah, totaling $300,000-$400,000 in damage. Farther north, several states reported destructed gales that inflicted damage to infrastructure and property and caused some deaths. Nationwide the hurricane caused at least 32 deaths. In Canada, where it rained for several days starting in September 10, the extratropical system claimed at least 10 lives.

=== Hurricane Six ===
- Category 2 hurricane (SSHWS)
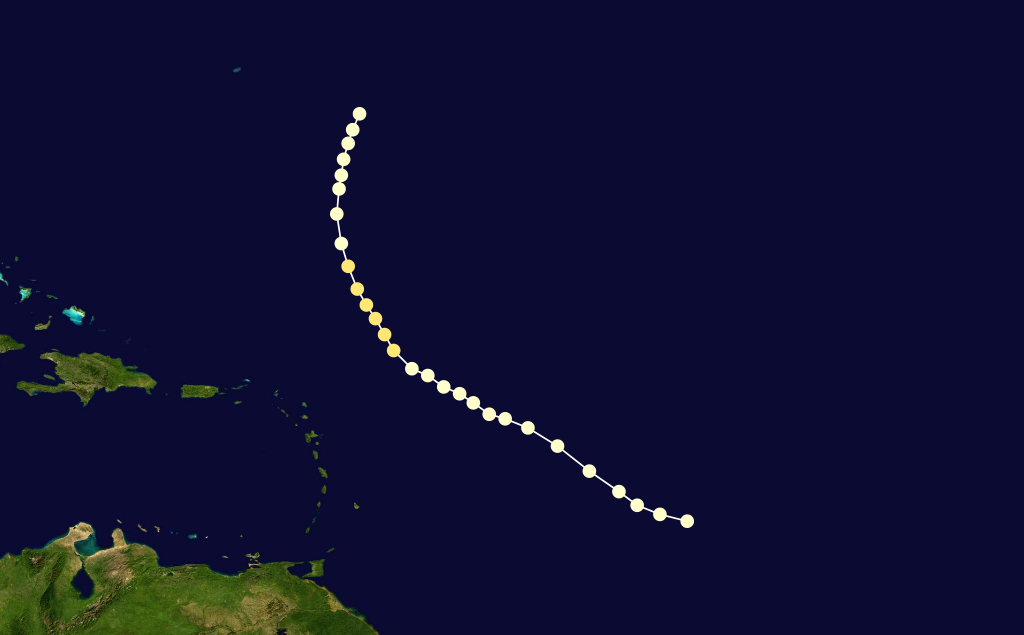
- Duration: September 12 – September 18
- Peak intensity: 105 mph (165 km/h) (1-min);

Ships began observing a "heavy hurricane", estimated to have been a Category 1 hurricane, over 1,000 mi (1,610 km) to the east of the Windward Islands starting on September 12, according to the Monthly Weather Review. Moving northwestward, the storm reached Category 2 intensity on September 15 and possessed sustained winds of 105 mph (165 km/h). HURDAT indicates that the cyclone weakened to a Category 1 hurricane early on September 17 before turning north-northeastward that day. The hurricane was last noted on September 18 about 350 mi (565 km) south-southeastward of Bermuda. Chenoweth theorized that this cyclone developed farther east-northeast on September 9. The storm moved west-northwestward until September 13, at which time it turned northwest, before trekking in a more northerly direction by September 18. Starting on September 21, the cyclone accelerated to the northeast and was last tracked by Chenoweth on September 23.

=== Hurricane Seven ===
- Category 4 hurricane (SSHWS)
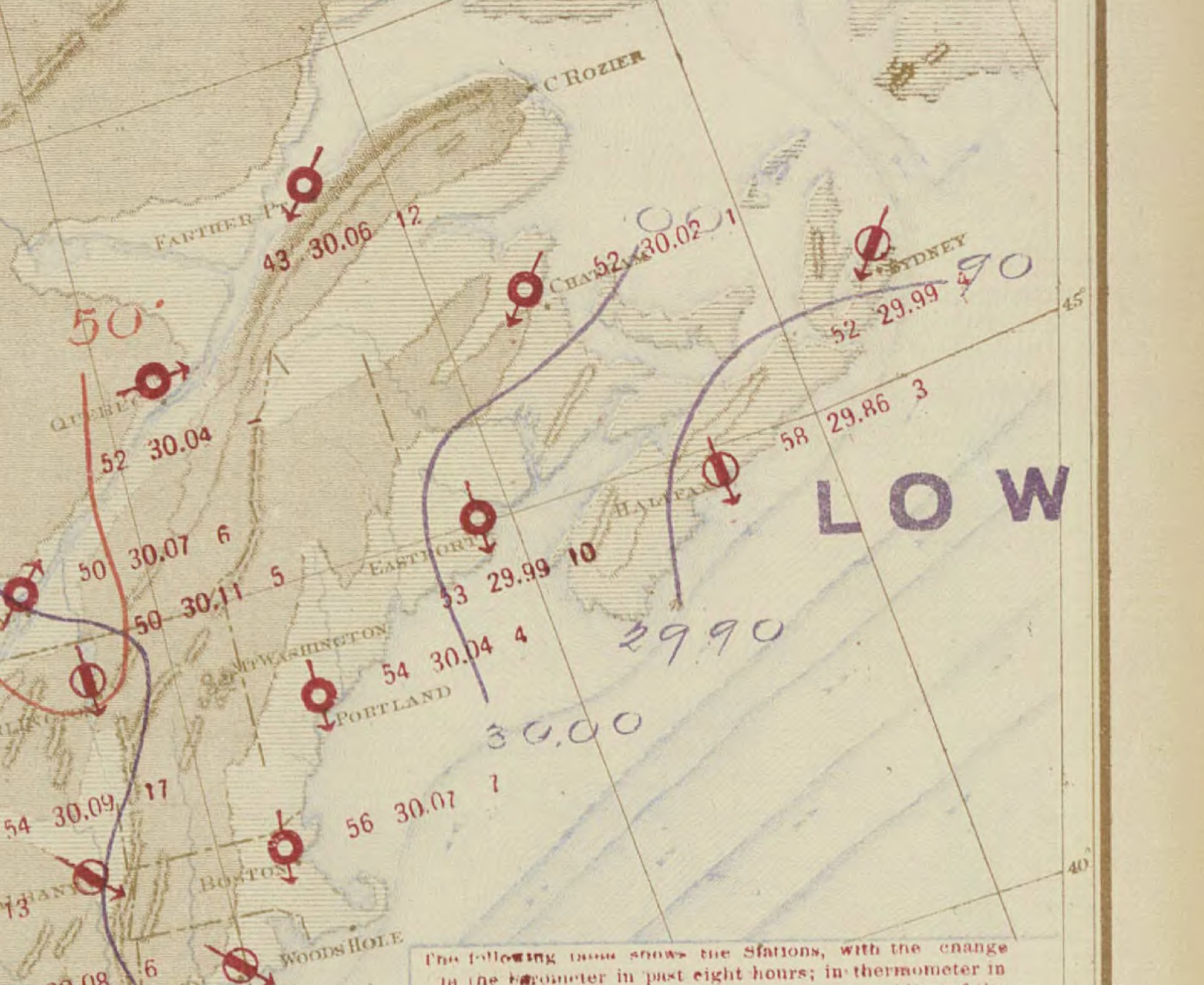
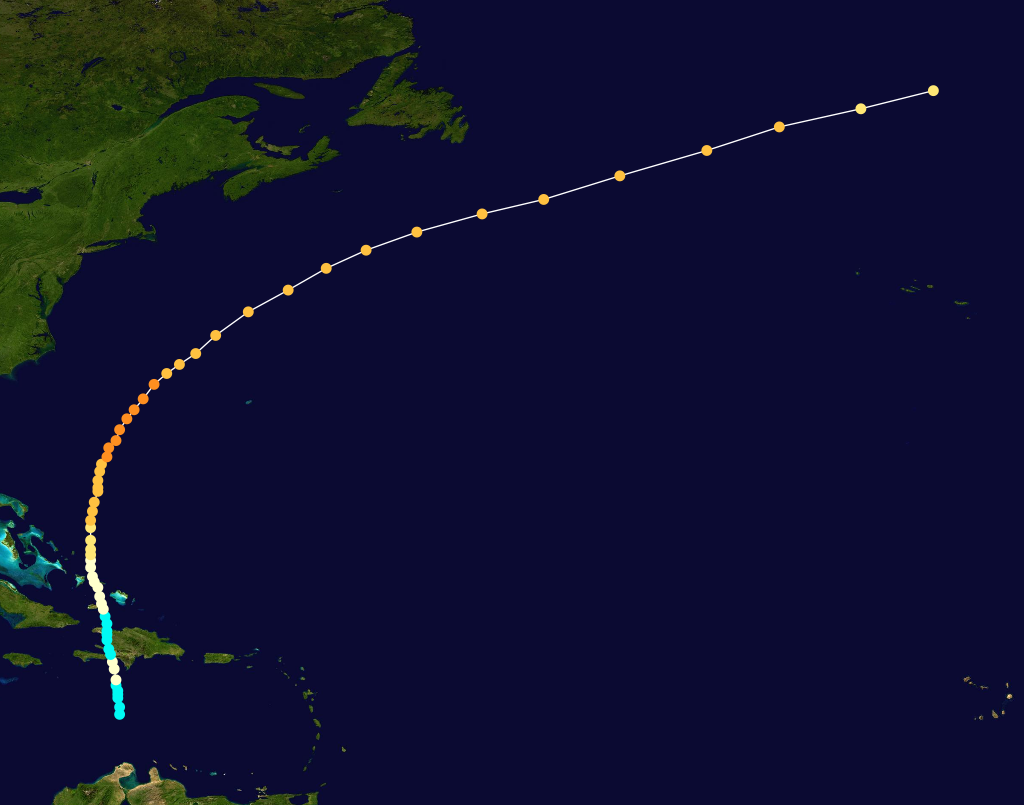
- Duration: September 24 – October 8
- Peak intensity: 140 mph (220 km/h) (1-min); 938 mbar (hPa)

The official track for this cyclone begins over the central Caribbean about halfway between the Guajira Peninsula and Hispaniola on September 24, one day before ships in the vicinity of Haiti first reported a storm. According to ship logs from the Princess Alexandra and William Phipps, the system strengthened into a hurricane on September 25 as it headed north-northwestward. Striking Haiti early the next day, the hurricane quickly weakened to a tropical storm while passing roughly 10 mi (15 km) to the west of Port-au-Prince. The storm rapidly regained hurricane status on September 28 after emerging into the Atlantic. It passed through the eastern Bahamas shortly thereafter, striking or moving close to islands such as Inagua and Mayaguana. Gradual additional strengthening occurred as the storm moved into the open Atlantic, reaching major hurricane intensity on October 1 and becoming a Category 4 hurricane with maximum sustained winds of 140 mph (220 km/h) on October 3, based on the ship Quebec logging a barometric pressure of 938 mbar (27.7 inHg). On the following day, the hurricane turned northeastward and maintained major hurricane status for a few days, even at a high latitude, roughly at 47.5N. However, the storm weakened to a Category 2 hurricane on October 8, several hours before being last seen approximately 740 mi (1,190 km) west-southwest of Ireland.

The reanalysis study by Chenoweth argued that this storm formed closer to Hispaniola and later moved erratically between the Bahamas and Bermuda for a few days before curving to the northeast. An American brigantine was wrecked in Haiti at Tiburon with all hands lost. The storm wrecked all lighters and two other vessels at Jacmel, where a number of homes were also demolished. Some rivers in Haiti swelled, causing difficulties in transporting relief supplies to victims of the fifth storm and increasing the cost of food to "famine prices", according to The Nassau Guardian. Mud reached approximately 6 in (150 mm) deep in the streets of Port-au-Prince. A few locations along the coast of North Carolina reported tropical storm-force winds, including sustained winds of 48 mph (77 km/h) at Cape Lookout. Meteorologists José Fernández-Partagás and Henry F. Díaz noted that these winds probably occurred in relation "to a strong pressure gradient due to the combination of the storm and high pressure over eastern U.S."

=== Hurricane Eight ===
- Category 1 hurricane (SSHWS)
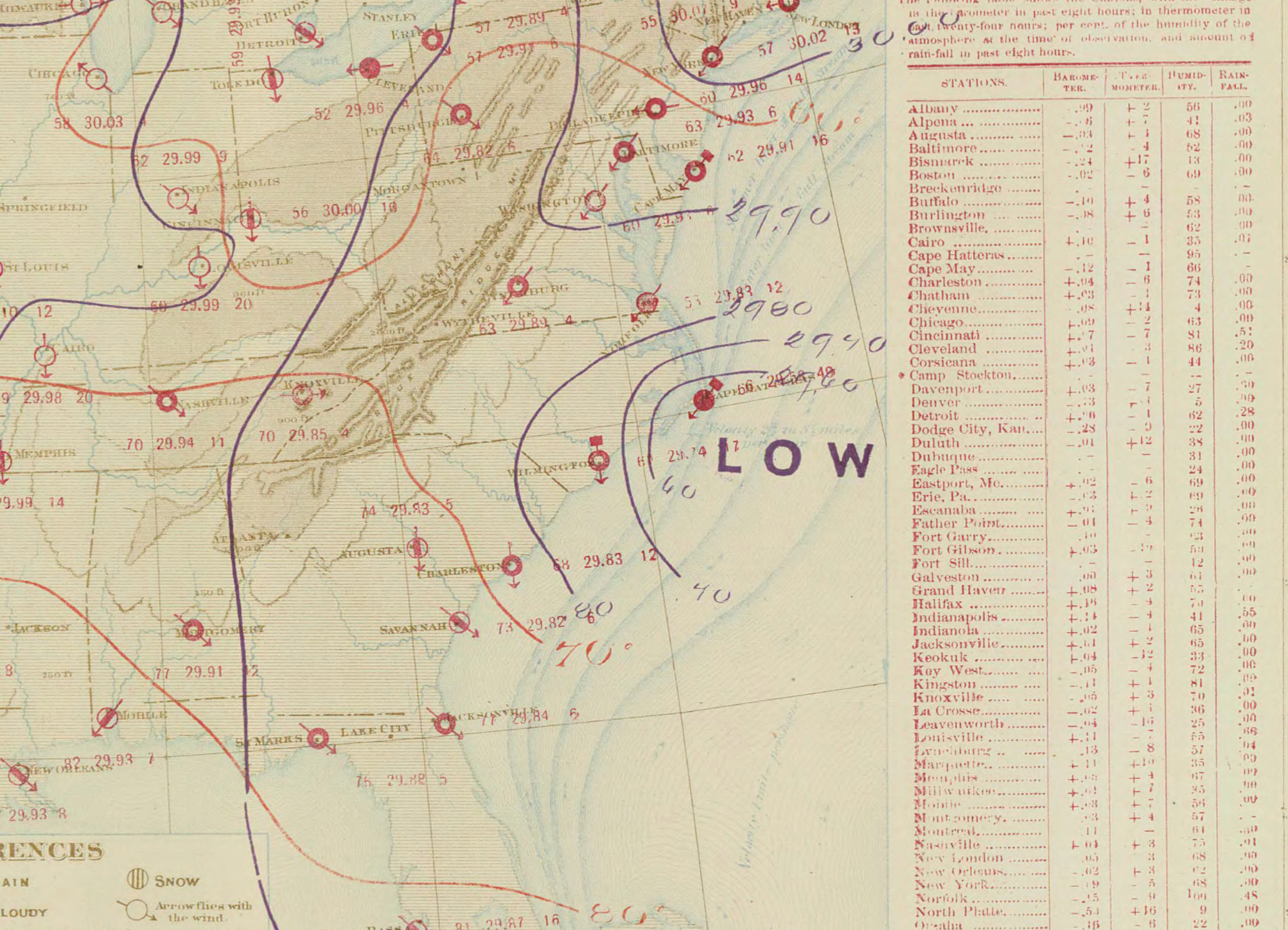
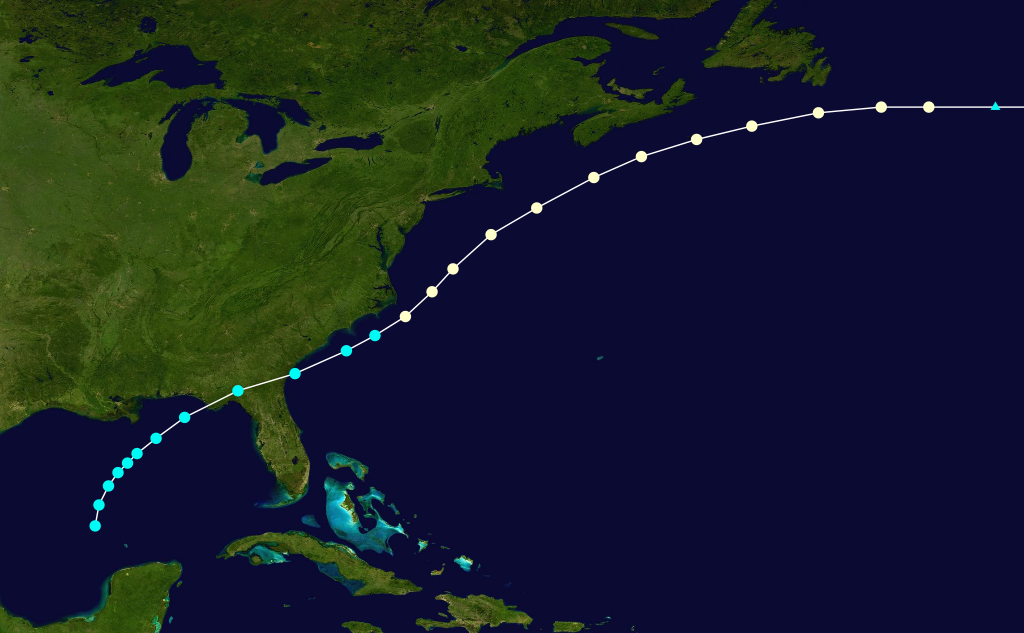
- Duration: October 9 – October 14
- Peak intensity: 80 mph (130 km/h) (1-min); 982 mbar (hPa)

Similar to the path constructed as part of the 1993 reanalysis led by meteorologist C. J. Neumann, HURDAT begins the track of this storm about 175 mi (280 km) north-northwest of the Yucatán Peninsula on October 9. Moving northeastward, the cyclone made landfall around 21:00 UTC the next day near modern-day Mexico Beach, Florida, with winds estimated at 60 mph (95 km/h). After emerging into the Atlantic from the coast of Georgia early on October 11, the storm intensified, reaching hurricane status about 24 hours later just under 60 mi (95 km) southeast of Cape Hatteras, North Carolina, based on reports from several ships. In accordance with another vessel observing a barometric pressure of 982 mbar (29.0 inHg), HURDAT estimated that this cyclone peaked with maximum sustained winds of 80 mph (130 km/h). The hurricane paralleled the coast of Nova Scotia and then turned eastward before becoming extratropical late on October 14 roughly 440 mi (710 km) east-southeast of Cape Race, Newfoundland.

Chenoweth argued that this cyclone did not exist in the Gulf of Mexico, instead forming northeast of the Bahamas on October 10. After moving northwestward until the following day, the storm curved northeast, avoiding landfall in the United States, and transitioned into an extratropical cyclone on October 13 offshore the Mid-Atlantic. Many locations along the East Coast of the United States as far north as Rhode Island reported tropical-storm force winds, including sustained winds up to 72 mph (116 km/h) at Cape Lookout, North Carolina. Rough seas damaged, wrecked, or beached numerous vessels along or offshore New England, including more than 50 on Cape Cod in Massachusetts. This led to 27 deaths, including 22 when the bark Sarah capsized. At Provincetown, Massachusetts, high winds downed chimneys, fences, and trees, and caused instances of minor damage elsewhere in the community.

=== Hurricane Nine ===
- Category 1 hurricane (SSHWS)
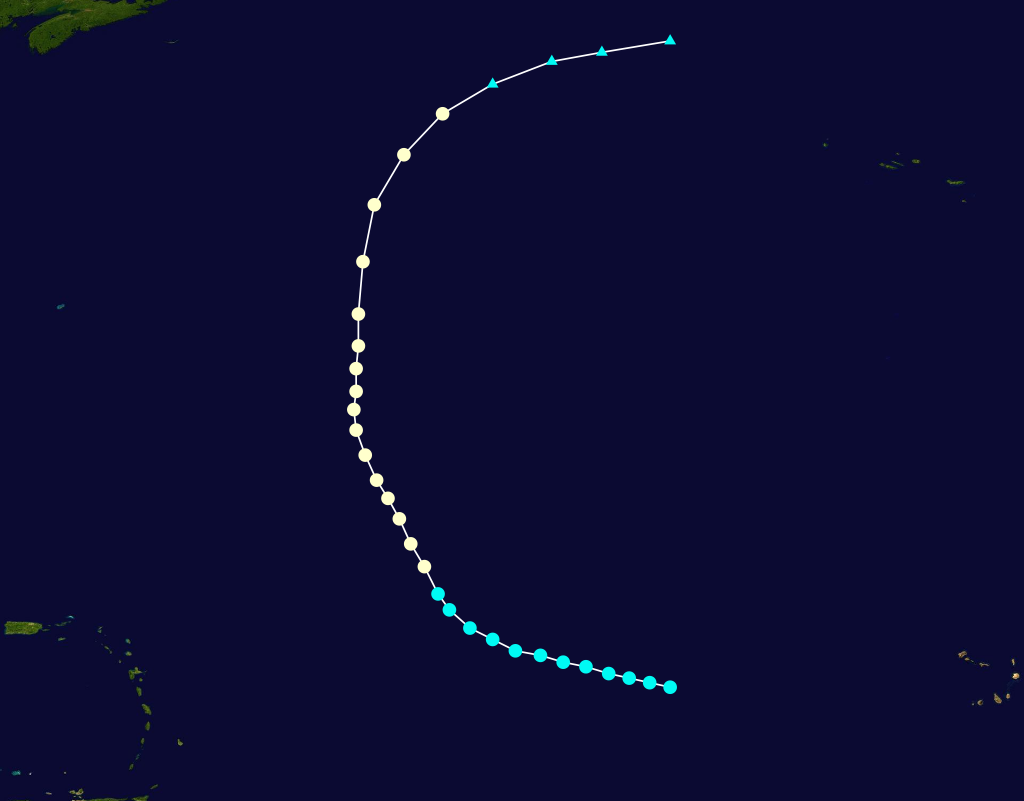
- Duration: October 9 – October 15
- Peak intensity: 80 mph (130 km/h) (1-min);

Although no observations relating to this storm prior to October 14 have been found, the official track listed in HURDAT begins on October 9 about 840 mi (1,350 km) west of the Cabo Verde Islands, electing to use the path constructed by Neumann. Initially trekking west-northwest, the storm turned northwestward on October 12, before intensifying into a hurricane with winds of 80 mph (130 km/h) early the next day. Later on October 13, the hurricane curved north-northeastward, a motion that the storm maintained until turning northeastward on October 15. After transitioning into an extratropical later on October 15 about 480 mi (770 km) southeast of Cape Race, Newfoundland, the remnants of this system likely merged with the remnants of the previous storm. The reanalysis study by Chenoweth proposed that, rather than moving parabolically, the cyclone headed northwestward through October 14, when it turned northeastward and intensified into a Category 3 major hurricane.

=== Hurricane Ten ===
- Category 3 hurricane (SSHWS)
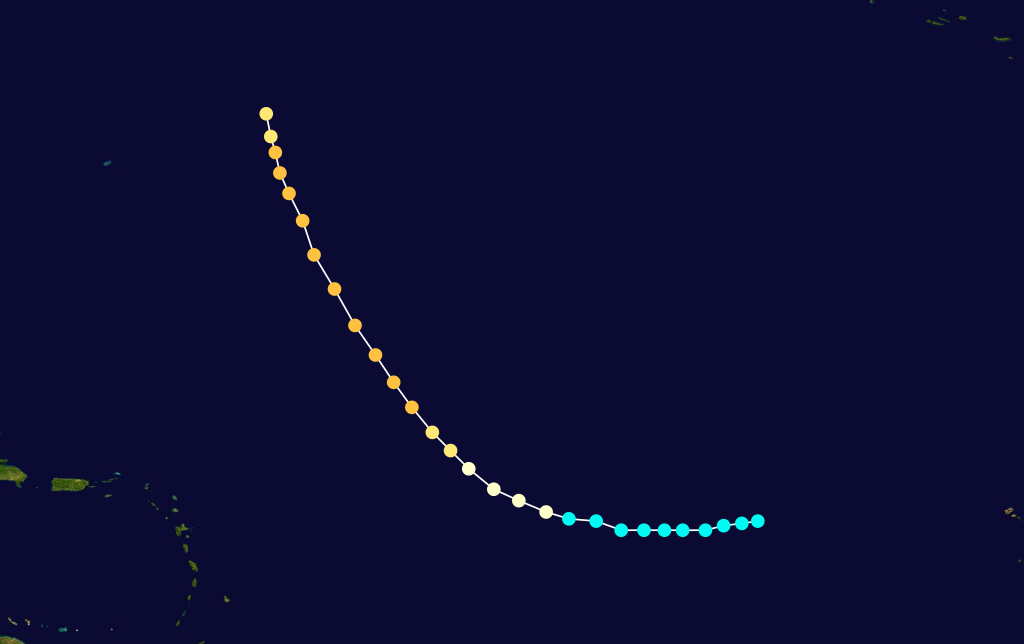
- Duration: October 13 – October 19
- Peak intensity: 115 mph (185 km/h) (1-min); 951 mbar (hPa)

Despite no reports of ships encountering the storm prior to October 18, HURDAT initiated the track of approximately 720 mi (1,160 km) roughly west of the Cabo Verde Islands on October 13. Initially moving generally westward, the cyclone turned northwestward on October 15 as it strengthened into a hurricane. Further intensification occurred, with the cyclone becoming a Category 3 major hurricane with maximum sustained winds of 115 mph (185 km/h) on October 17, one day before the schooner George T. Thatcher reported a barometric pressure of 951 mbar (28.1 inHg). The hurricane weakened to a Category 2 before being last seen late on October 19 roughly 400 mi (645 km) east-northeast of Bermuda. Chenoweth postulated that this cyclone formed offshore modern-day Mauritania on October 10 and passed north of the Cabo Verde Islands while trekking generally westward. By October 14, the system curved northwestward and intensified into a strong Category 4 hurricane with maximum sustained winds of 150 mph (240 km/h), based on a barometric pressure of 927 mbar (27.4 inHg). Chenoweth last detected the storm on October 18.

=== Hurricane Eleven ===
- Category 2 hurricane (SSHWS)
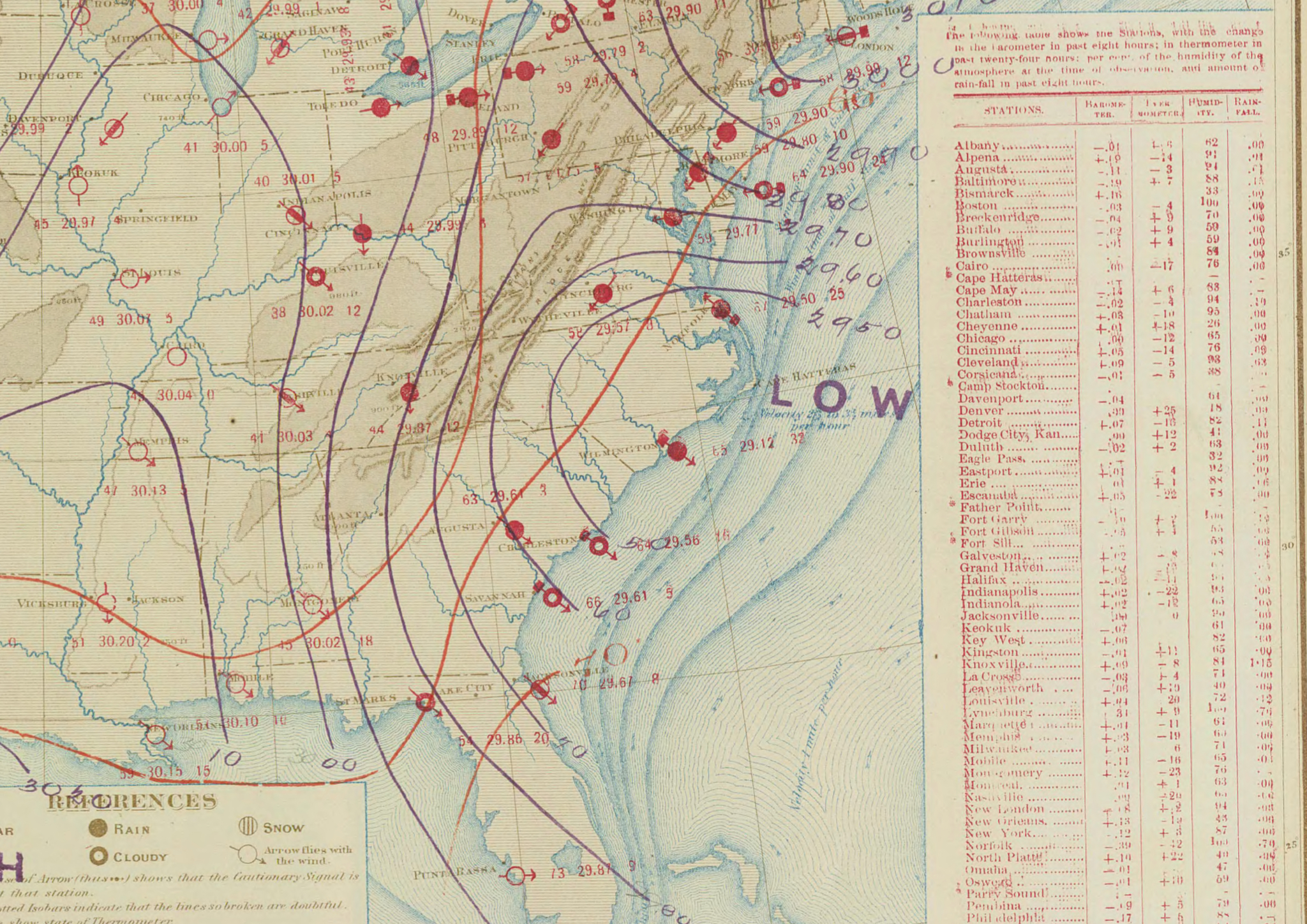
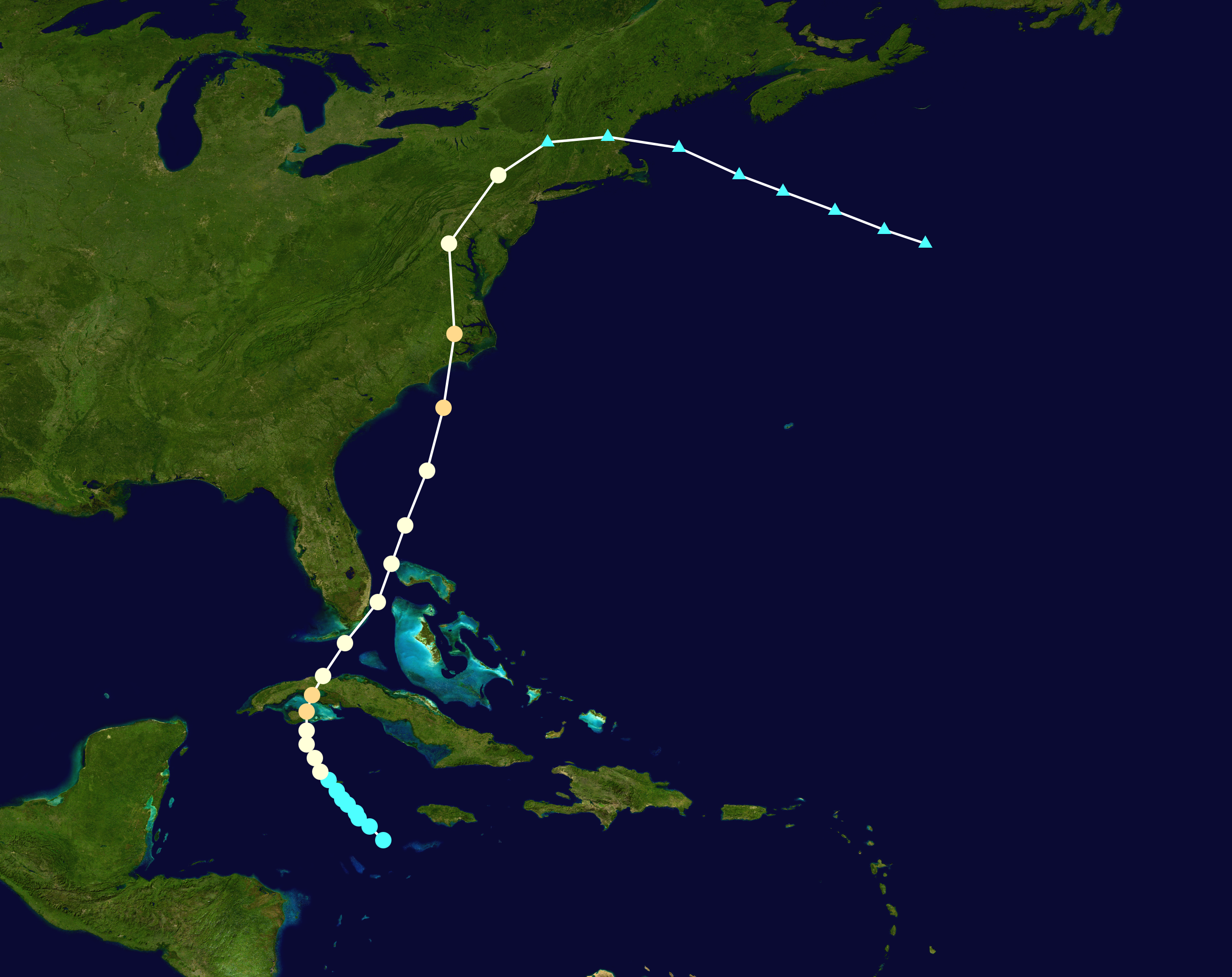
- Duration: October 18 – October 23
- Peak intensity: 105 mph (165 km/h) (1-min); 963 mbar (hPa)

The track listed in HURDAT for this cyclone begins about 110 mi (175 km) southwest of Jamaica on October 18, one day after Father Benito Viñes first reported a storm over the western Caribbean and one day before Kingston recorded 1.4 in (36 mm) of rain. Drifting northwestward, the system slowly strengthened, reaching hurricane status on October 20. Early the next day, the cyclone struck Cuba near Playa Mayabeque in present-day Mayabeque Province likely as a Category 2 hurricane, based on a 2000 reanalysis by Ramón Pérez Suárez. Turning northeastward and emerging into the Straits of Florida, the hurricane, then a Category 1, passed less than 20 mi (30 km) east of Florida on October 22. The cyclone re-intensified into a Category 2 hurricane early on October 23 shortly before making landfall near Emerald Isle, North Carolina, with winds of 105 mph (165 km/h), based on sustained winds of 100 mph (155 km/h) at Cape Lookout, (Note: Similar velocities occurred at Kitty Hawk.) and an estimated barometric pressure of 963 mbar (28.4 inHg). The hurricane raced across the interior of the United States until becoming extratropical over New York late on October 23.

Chenoweth's reanalysis study suggested that this storm formed just north of Jamaica on October 13, moved slowly northwestward, and later crossed southern Florida from October 21 to early the next day before resuming a course similar to that shown in HURDAT. In Cuba, meteorologist Simón Sarasola reported hurricane-force winds and heavy rains as far east as Cienfuegos, resulting in "considerable damage and loss of life." The hurricane beached more than a dozen vessels along the east coast of Florida, while Key West recorded wind gusts up to 54 mph (87 km/h). Georgia and South Carolina reported only minor impacts. Several ships capsized or disappeared from the coast of North Carolina, including the steamer City of Houston, leading to four deaths and at least $200,000 in damage. A total of 21 people died in Virginia, all due to 22 shipwrecks in the state, with 19 people killed when a ship, the A.S. Davis, was driven ashore at Virginia Beach. Severe damage occurred in coastal Virginia, including to life-saving stations, while the storm completely submerged Cobb and Smith islands. Washington, D.C., and several states farther north reported many downed trees and telegraph wires, damaged crops, and unroofed buildings, as well as five deaths in Maryland, eighteen in Delaware, twelve in Pennsylvania, eight in New Jersey, and two in Connecticut. In Philadelphia, Pennsylvania, alone, the hurricane destroyed at least 700 buildings and toppled almost 50 church spires. Damage throughout the state reached $2.14 million. Overall, the storm caused at least 71 fatalities and more than $2.46 million in damage.

=== Tropical Storm Twelve ===
- Tropical storm (SSHWS)
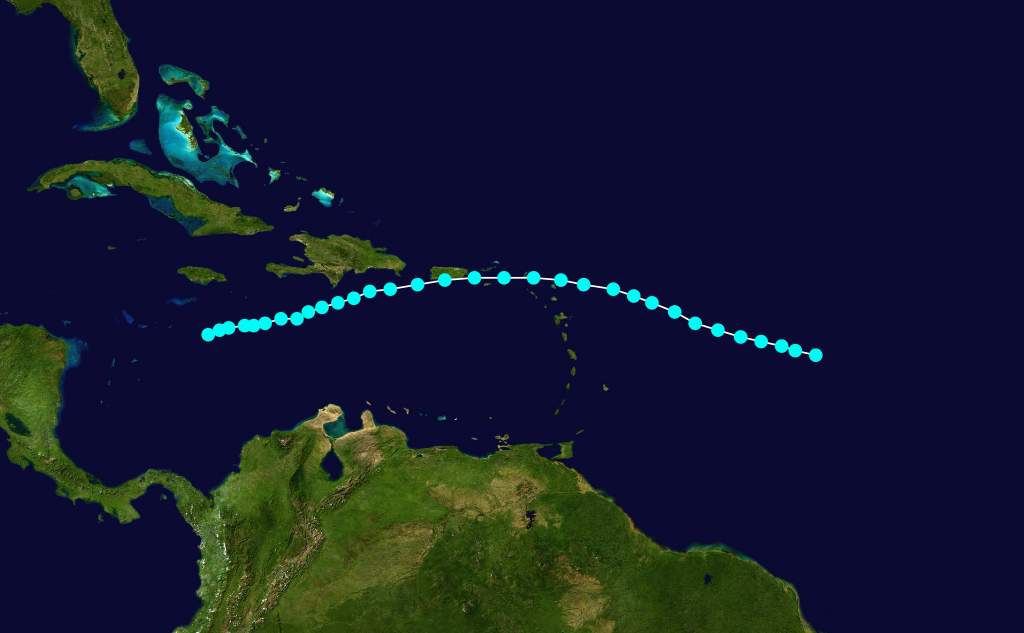
- Duration: November 25 – December 2
- Peak intensity: 70 mph (110 km/h) (1-min);

According to the Monthly Weather Review, a tropical storm was first detected on November 25 approximately 700 mi (1,125 km) east of the Lesser Antilles. After moving generally west-northwestward for a few days, the cyclone reached the Lesser Antilles on November 28 and passed near or over Saint Martin with winds of 70 mph (110 km/h). Despite reports of a "violent hurricane" south of Saint Thomas, neither Fernández-Partagás and Díaz nor the Atlantic hurricane reanalysis project could confirm that this system intensified into a hurricane. The storm then moved near the southern coast of Puerto Rico later that day and early on November 29 while turning west-southwestward. As the cyclone reached a position approximately 160 mi (255 km) south of Jamaica on December 2, Fernández-Partagás and Díaz ended the track for this system, doing so "in order to allow for a northerly flow air to have set in over entire western Caribbean Sea."

The reanalysis study by Chenoweth argued that this storm remained north of the Lesser Antilles until turning southwestward on November 29 and striking Puerto Rico. After emerging into the Caribbean on November 30, the cyclone moved generally westward, striking the south coast of the Dominican Republic a few times and trekking across Haiti's Tiburon Peninsula before dissipating near Navassa Island on December 2. Minimal impacts occurred in the Leeward Islands, aside from a few trading boats being beached at Sandy Point Town on Saint Kitts. The storm's effects were felt in southeastern and southern Puerto Rico, where the storm was christened San Rufo. It was first known tropical storm to impact Puerto Rico in November. Three people drowned at Aguadilla due to rough seas. In the Dominican Republic, the schooner Thos Pickering was driven ashore along the country's east coast. Farther west, Navassa Island experienced squalls.

=== Other storms ===
Climate researcher Michael Chenoweth proposed five other storms not currently listed in HURDAT. The first such cyclone developed on July 7 near the northern Leeward Islands. Moving west-northwestward, the system passed near or over Anguilla and Anegada. The storm then curved northwestward. After making a brief jog westward on July 11, the cyclone resumed moving northwestward passing near the Abaco Islands and over Grand Bahama. On July 12, the system made landfall near Flagler Beach, Florida, and rapidly dissipated. Chenoweth's next proposed storm developed over the central Atlantic on September 2. The cyclone moved northeastward until September 5, then northward through September 7, when it turned northeastward. By the following day, the storm turned southeastward, a motion that the system would continue on until turning northeastward on September 11. Approaching the Azores, the storm struck Flores Island on the following day, several hours before becoming extratropical.

The next proposed storm formed about halfway between the Lesser Antilles and the Cabo Verde Islands on September 4. This cyclone moved in a parabolic path, heading generally northwestward through September 8, northward from September 8 to September 10, east-northeastward until September 15, and then east-southeastward before dissipating on September 18. Another unofficial cyclone developed on September 13 in the Bay of Campeche, just offshore Isla Aguada, Campeche. Initially heading in a west-northwestward to westward direction, the storm turned southward on September 16. Early the next day, the system made landfall near Montepío, Veracruz, and rapidly dissipated after moving inland. Chenoweth's final proposed cyclone formed over the east-central Atlantic on October 23. After initially moving west-northwestward, the cyclone curved northwestward on October 24 and then north-northwestward on the following day. Beginning a north-northeastward motion on October 26, the storm turned northeastward on October 27 and was last noted by Chenoweth on October 28 well northwest of the Azores.

== Season effects ==
This is a table of all of the known storms that have formed in the 1878 Atlantic hurricane season. It includes their duration, landfall, damages, and death totals. Deaths in parentheses are additional and indirect (an example of an indirect death would be a traffic accident), but were still related to that storm. Damage and deaths include totals while the storm was extratropical, a wave, or a low, and all of the damage figures are in 1878 USD.

1878 North Atlantic tropical cyclone season statistics
| Storm name | Dates active | Storm category at peak intensity | Max 1-min wind mph (km/h) | Min. press. (mbar) | Areas affected | Damage (US$) | Deaths | Ref(s). |
|---|---|---|---|---|---|---|---|---|
| One | July 1–3 | Tropical storm | 45 (75) | 1008 | Southeastern United States (Florida) | Unknown | None | |
| Two | August 4–14 | Category 1 hurricane | 80 (130) | Unknown | Lesser Antilles, Mexico (Tamaulipas) | Unknown | None | |
| Three | August 19–20 | Category 1 hurricane | 90 (150) | 963 | Atlantic Canada | Unknown | None | |
| Four | August 25–30 | Category 2 hurricane | 105 (165) | ≤972 | The Bahamas, Bermuda | Unknown | None | |
| Five | September 1–13 | Category 2 hurricane | 105 (165) | 970 | Windward Islands, Greater Antilles (Haiti and Cuba), Eastern United States (Florida), Ontario | >$919,000 | >60 | |
| Six | September 12–18 | Category 2 hurricane | 105 (165) | Unknown | None | None | None | |
| Seven | September 24 – October 8 | Category 4 hurricane | 140 (230) | 938 | Hispaniola (Haiti), Turks and Caicos Islands | Unknown | Unknown | |
| Eight | October 9–14 | Category 1 hurricane | 80 (130) | 982 | East Coast of the United States (Florida) | Unknown | 27 | |
| Nine | October 9–15 | Category 1 hurricane | 80 (130) | Unknown | None | None | None | |
| Ten | October 13–19 | Category 3 hurricane | 115 (185) | 951 | None | None | None | |
| Eleven | October 18–23 | Category 2 hurricane | 105 (165) | 963 | Greater Antilles (Cuba), East Coast of the United States (North Carolina) | >$2.46 million | >71 | |
| Twelve | November 25 – December 2 | Tropical storm | 70 (110) | Unknown | Lesser Antilles, Greater Antilles | Unknown | 3 | |
Season aggregates
| 12 systems | July 1 – December 2 | | 140 (230) | 938 | | >$3.38 million | >161 | |

== See also ==
- Tropical cyclone observation
- Atlantic hurricane reanalysis project

== Sources ==
- Barnes, Jay (1998). Florida's Hurricane History (1st ed.). Chapel Hill, North Carolina: Chapel Hill Press. ISBN 0-8078-2443-7.
- "Barometric pressure". Monthly Weather Review. 6 (9). Washington, D.C.: U.S. Army Signal Corps: 1–5. September 1878. Bibcode:1878MWRv....6RT..1.. doi:10.1175/1520-0493(1878)69[1b:BP]2.0.CO;2.
- Fernández-Partagás, José; Diaz, Henry F. (1995). A Reconstruction of Historical Tropical Cyclone Frequency in the Atlantic from Documentary and other Historical Sources : 1851-1880 Part II: 1871-1880 (PDF). Climate Diagnostics Center (Report). Boulder, Colorado: National Oceanic and Atmospheric Administration.
- Grazulis, Thomas P. (July 1993). Significant Tornadoes 1680–1991: A Chronology and Analysis of Events. St. Johnsbury, Vermont: The Tornado Project of Environmental Films. ISBN 1-879362-03-1.
- Hudgins, James E. (2000). Written at Blacksburg, Virginia. Tropical Cyclones Affecting North Carolina since 1566 – An Historical Perspective. NOAA Seattle Library (Technical report). National Weather Service (NWS) Technical Memos. Seattle: National Weather Service. ER-92, Tropical Cyclones Affecting North Carolina. Archived from the original on March 11, 2007.
- "Precipitation". Monthly Weather Review. 6 (9). Washington, D.C.: U.S. Army Signal Corps: 9–10. September 1878. Bibcode:1878MWRv....6RT..9.. doi:10.1175/1520-0493(1878)69[9:P]2.0.CO;2 – via American Meteorological Society.
- "Winds". Monthly Weather Review. 6 (9). Washington, D.C.: U.S. Army Signal Corps: 10–11. September 1878. Bibcode:1878MWRv....6RS.10.. doi:10.1175/1520-0493(1878)69[10b:W]2.0.CO;2.
