= Montepio =

Montepio may refer to:

- Banco Montepio, a Portuguese bank
- Montepío, a village in Veracruz, Mexico

== See also ==
- Mount of piety, a charitable institution
- Nacional Monte de Piedad, a charitable institution
