= 1878 Haiti–Florida hurricane =

Category 2 Atlantic hurricane

Hurricane Five 1878 Kissimmee hurricane
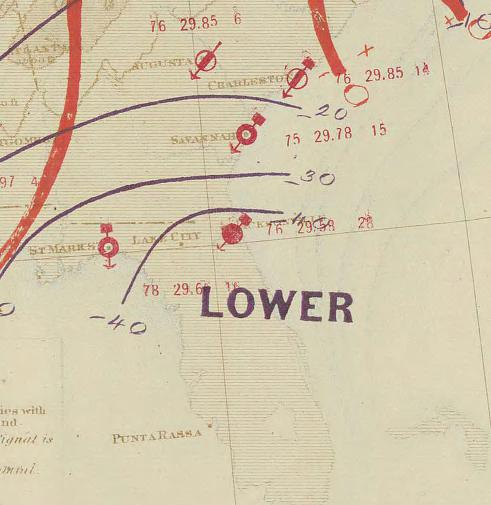
- Surface weather analysis of the storm over Northeast Florida on September 11

Meteorological history
- Formed: September 1, 1878
- Extratropical: September 13, 1978
- Dissipated: September 13, 1878

Category 2 hurricane
- 1-minute sustained (SSHWS/NWS)
- Highest winds: 105 mph (165 km/h)
- Lowest pressure: 970 mbar (hPa); 28.64 inHg (estimated)

Tornado outbreak
- Tornadoes: ≥ 9
- Max. rating: F2 tornado
- Duration: September 12, 1878

Overall effects
- Fatalities: > 56 (+3 tornado-related, 1 indirect)
- Damage: >$919,000 (1878 USD) ($30.7 million in 2025 USD)
- Areas affected: Windward Islands; Hispaniola; Cuba; British Bahamas; Eastern United States; Ontario; Quebec
- Part of the 1878 Atlantic hurricane season

The 1878 Haiti–Florida hurricane, also known as the Kissimmee hurricane, was a large, slow-moving Atlantic hurricane that was the most severe to impact the island of Trinidad since 1838. It also caused significant damage to portions of the Greater Antilles, chiefly Hispaniola, and eastern North America, primarily via powerful winds, storm surge, and rainfall-induced flooding. The fifth tropical storm and fourth hurricane of the annual season, it developed over the western tropical Atlantic north of South America on September 1; well formed at the time, it likely originated farther east but went undetected. Quickly strengthening into a hurricane, it impacted the Windward Islands, extensively damaging watercraft, infrastructure, and agriculture, but causing few fatalities. Three days later it struck Hispaniola with winds up to 90 mph (150 km/h), flattening numerous buildings, devastating crops, and claiming at least 16 lives, though estimates ranged upward of several hundred due to the scale of destruction, which dispersed entire populations. A day later the cyclone hit Cuba as a minimal hurricane, spreading relentless rainfall, along with crop damage, over portions of the island and the Lucayan Archipelago as it drifted near the country's northern coast for a few days.

On September 7 it suddenly veered northward, impacting the Florida Keys and southern Florida peninsula as a high-end tropical storm. Over the next three days it slid west-northwest, wandering back offshore over the eastern Gulf of Mexico. There it rapidly restrengthened, peaking with winds of 105 mph (165 km/h), and backtracked, moving inland over the Nature Coast on September 10. For several days the storm—its effects heightened by its size, slow motion, and a surrounding high-pressure area—delivered copious rain, gusty winds, and high tides to Florida, as it moved erratically over or near much of that state. The rains soaked wide swaths of the south-central peninsula, swamping riparian zones in the region, above all the areas northwest of Lake Okeechobee, while stiff winds downed trees, telecommunications, and fragile structures over a broad cross-section of the state, resulting in a fatality. The storm alternately shed and regained hurricane intensity within a few days of crossing Florida, arcing more to the north before making a final landfall in South Carolina—with Saffir–Simpson winds ranking it a strong Category 1 storm—on September 12. It then sped inland, its tropical features unraveling over West Virginia a day later before dissipation over Canada.

The storm buffeted ships offshore Cuba, the Bahamas, and the United States, causing wrecks from the Florida to the Carolinas. Staple and other crops suffered damage from wind and rain, mainly in low-lying areas near water on the coastal plain. Most casualties in the Southeast north of Florida were from drownings or hurricane-spawned tornadoes, some retroactively rated F2 or stronger by meteorologists, that claimed four lives from the Carolinas to Virginia. Historic floods attended the storm's trek across the Appalachian Mountains and into Canada, with fast-rising rivers engulfing communities in several U.S. states and a few Canadian provinces. Railroads and other vital infrastructure, such as bridges, in both nations bore the brunt of the storm, owing to local hydrological milestones set by the storm, such as river rises and rainfall amounts unseen in years. At least 11 of the 32 dead in the U.S. were railroad employees whose trains collapsed due to mudslides or cave-ins from floodwaters. All 10 deaths in Canada were flood-related, as the storm was responsible for major inundations in Greater Toronto and adjourning areas. Cumulatively, the cyclone was blamed for at least 60 deaths and over $900,000 in losses.

== Meteorological history ==
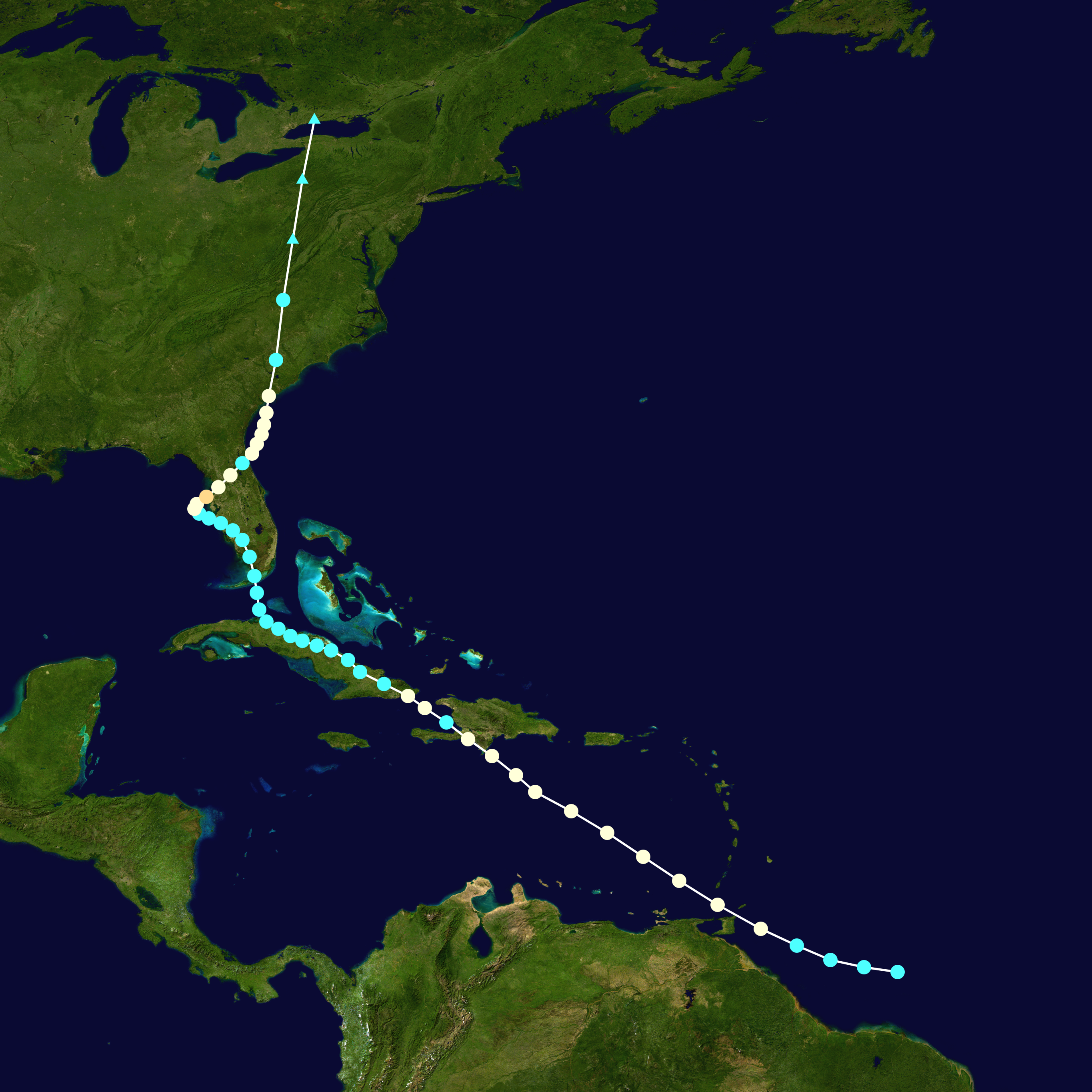
Map plotting the storm's track and intensity, according to the Saffir–Simpson scale Map key Saffir–Simpson scale Tropical depression (≤38 mph, ≤62 km/h) Tropical storm (39–73 mph, 63–118 km/h) Category 1 (74–95 mph, 119–153 km/h) Category 2 (96–110 mph, 154–177 km/h) Category 3 (111–129 mph, 178–208 km/h) Category 4 (130–156 mph, 209–251 km/h) Category 5 (≥157 mph, ≥252 km/h) Unknown Storm type Tropical cyclone Subtropical cyclone Extratropical cyclone, remnant low, tropical disturbance, or monsoon depression

The storm—regarded as the most noteworthy Atlantic system that month due to its climatologically unusual beginning, route, and longevity—likely crystallized between 6° and 10°N, just south of Portuguese Cape Verde, but first appeared in the Atlantic hurricane database (HURDAT) about 500 mi (805 km) east-southeast of Port of Spain, Trinidad, at 00:00 UTC on September 1, at which time it bore winds of 60 mph (95 km/h), equal to a moderate tropical storm, a day before the first observations were made confirming its existence. Heading west-northwest, it reached hurricane status—Category 1 on the modern Saffir–Simpson scale—a day later. Early on September 2, its eye passed between Tobago and Trinidad with sustained winds of 80–90 mph (130–150 km/h). As it did so, it gradually veered northwestward, a heading it maintained over the eastern Caribbean for two days. Retaining force, the storm made two consecutive landfalls on Hispaniola early on September 4: over present-day Jaragua National Park, Dominican Republic, then near Belle-Anse, Haiti, at a slightly lower intensity. A study by Michael Chenoweth in 2014, however, concluded that the storm never hit the Dominican Republic and grazed the southwestern edge of the Tiburon Peninsula instead, but its findings have yet to be incorporated into HURDAT.

The hurricane lost some potency over western Haiti, reemerging over water near Gressier. Bypassing Port-au-Prince Bay, it briefly degenerated into a tropical storm over Gonâve Island. It quickly recovered, however, over the Windward Passage, and reached a secondary peak of 80 mph (130 km/h) before striking eastern Cuba on September 5. Interaction with land failed to weaken the storm appreciably; for two days the storm, now heading west-northwestward, slowed and meandered along coastal northern Cuba, maintaining winds of 60 mph (95 km/h). Reports from Cuban cities gathered by Benito Vines traced the path of the storm, with Santa Clara enduring the transit of the vortex. Early on September 7 the storm, traversing the Sabana-Camagüey Archipelago, turned sharply northward, toward the Straits of Florida. At 21:00 UTC that day it struck Duck Key in the Florida Keys with winds of 70 mph (110 km/h), and five hours later hit the South Florida mainland near Flamingo. At the time a robust ridge built to its north, inducing a slow drift for a few days.

Spending a day over land, the storm abruptly shifted course, heading west-northwestward once more, and entered the eastern Gulf of Mexico near Sarasota early on September 9. Rapidly intensifying over water, the storm attained winds of 105 mph (165 km/h)—the highest in its lifespan—and suddenly reversed course, moving inland near present-day Pine Island, north of Bayport, at 11:00 UTC on September 10. (Note: Chenoweth's path did not reenter the Gulf, instead stalling over Charlotte Harbor and moving north over peninsular Florida, after tracking from near Marathon to near Dismal Key—an island east of Cape Romano—as a Category 2 hurricane.) Using a simulation to extrapolate the decay of a storm over land, the Atlantic hurricane reanalysis project determined its central pressure at landfall to be 970 mb (29 inHg), based on a report of 29.09 inHg (985 mb) taken in the eye at St. Augustine, and used data from three weather stations to verify its track on September 9–10, but older HURDAT and Chenoweth's study kept it inland near or east of Punta Gorda. After passing inland north of Tampa Bay, its center tracked northeastward across North Florida to enter the western Atlantic Ocean on September 11. Having weakened to a strong tropical storm, the cyclone soon became a hurricane again while curving sharply north-northeastward, and attained winds of 90 mph (150 km/h). At 12:00 UTC the next day, it made its last landfall on an island in Saint Helena Sound, just west of present-day Edisto Beach, South Carolina, at the same intensity, and steadily lost strength as it accelerated inland, becoming extratropical over eastern West Virginia in the forenoon on September 13. Its remnants reached southernmost Ontario late that day, at which point they lost identity.

== Precautions and impact ==
=== Caribbean and Bahamas ===
Deaths and damage by region
Region	Total deaths	Damage (USD)	Source(s)
Canada	10	>$78,000	
Cuba	—N/a	—N/a	
Carolinas	2	—N/a	
Dominican Republic	—N/a	—N/a	
Florida	2	—N/a	
Georgia	5	≥$300,000	
Haiti	≥16	—N/a	
New York	1		
Ohio	2	≥$340,000	
Pennsylvania	11	≥$200,000	
The Bahamas	—N/a	—N/a	
Trinidad and Tobago	2	—N/a	
Virginia	1	≥$1,000	
West Virginia	5		
Elsewhere (in U.S.)	3	—N/a	
Totals:	60+	>$919,000	
Because of differing sources, totals may not match.

As the storm passed near Trinidad, Port of Spain registered its lowest pressure to date, 29.05 inHg (984 mb), along with an hour-long lull and a 90° wind shift. A "trustworthy authority" cited by The Port of Spain Gazette stated that no similar storm had hit there since 1810, while the Monthly Weather Review considered the storm's impacts to be the worst in 40 years. Residents rode out the hurricane in the ground floor of buildings, although few structures survived unscathed. High winds flung shutters, tiles, tree branches, and roofs as debris. In Port of Spain, the hurricane wrecked or sank the boats in the harbor, including the harbormaster's launch. The storm also washed ashore seven lighters and one schooner, strewing debris along 2 mi (3.2 km) of coast; it also tore cordage and sails off three larger boats.

Winds toppled large trees islandwide, which fell onto buildings and together with washouts halted traffic. The storm destroyed the island's largest coconut plantations, one of which belonged to chief justice Joseph Needham, with downed palms numbering in the tens of thousands. Rainfall of up to 7 in (180 mm) culminated in flash floods that annihilated bridges, causeways, wharves, and warehouses, during which several sites noted "earthquake shocks", according to a summary by the Monthly Weather Review. Two people drowned offshore. On neighboring Tobago the storm leveled homes "all over the island", the San Fernando Gazette reported. Elsewhere in the Lesser Antilles the storm's edges yielded heavy rains, rough seas, and squally weather, with Fort-de-France, Martinique, measuring 146 mm (5.7 in) of rainfall on September 1–2. The forces of the storm destroyed jetties, flooded roads, and impacted fruit crops.

On Hispaniola the storm caused unspecified damage at Santo Domingo in the Dominican Republic. In Haiti the storm ravaged plantations, some of which it swept bare, destroying three-fourths of the coffee crop and crippling cocoa yields. Wind and sea severely damaged numerous communities, including Jacmel, where the storm mostly destroyed waterfront construction. High seas virtually erased Jérémie, Saint-Louis-du-Sud, and parts of Grand'Anse, tearing apart all 55 beachfront homes at Bainet. Rivers such as the Jacmel overflowed, effacing gardens and homes; severe flooding afflicted Port-Salut, Torbeck, and Côteaux.

Powerful winds blew down hundreds of homes and other structures, and wholly or partly unroofed those that survived, resulting in numerous casualties, especially in Les Cayes Arrondissement. There the storm wrecked 434 homes, 120 of them at Les Cayes alone, along with several of the largest rum distilleries (French: guildives), a schoolhouse, an arsenal, a prison, a military headquarters, a courthouse, a bridge, and a church. At Aquin the storm rendered irreparable 131 houses—all but 40 of the total—and left the town itself partly underwater. At Cavaillon, where only a few homes survived, the storm killed 11 children and women in a collapsed church; elsewhere first responders retrieved five deceased bodies. At Corail the storm shattered 40 homes and the American schooner Warden, but rescuers salvaged the latter's crew. Across Haiti the storm mangled more ships and warehouses, ruining goods such as over 1,500,000 lb (680,000 kg) of wool. Debris and trees clogged streets, hindering transportation. The storm depopulated entire settlements, hampering efforts to monitor the dead and injured; officials assessed an unknown but large number of victims, with "hundreds" of deaths rumored.

We learn by an arrival from Andros Island that the fall of rain there recently has been immense, so much indeed that in the neighbourhood of Fresh Creek (which is really a small Fresh Water river) the fresh water extends out into the sea as far as the edge of soundings, and can clearly be distinguished from the sea water.

— Nassau Times,

During landfall the storm lashed Cuba with hurricane-force winds of "remarkable velocity", as claimed by the Monthly Weather Review, but its effects on the island mainly consisted of freshwater flooding. The worst floods on record hit western Cuba, deluging 60 plantations between Colón and Cárdenas. The New York Times stated that Havana suffered "tempestuous and very rainy" conditions for a week, but with little impact on sugarcane fields. In the Straits of Florida turbulent seas forced the crew of the Sally Brown to abandon ship and be picked up by the steamer Carondelet. The Rebecca Carnana endured hurricane-force winds in the Straits for three days, losing its mainsail and a pair of topsails.

In the Bahamas the storm blew down crops and several homes on Bimini, where locals deemed the cyclone "very severe", as reported by the Nassau Times. The storm dumped vast quantities of rainfall, dousing horticulture, including several hundred banana batches. At Nassau air pressures dipped to 29.60 inHg (1,002 mb), at a time the storm was centered about 400 mi (645 km) away. At the height of the storm gales pounded New Providence, and the Nassau Times noted a "heavy hurricane" to the southwest. On Andros heavy rainfall fell for days, swelling waterways due to surface runoff and leading to freshwater discharges that killed thousands of saltwater fish. The outflow ruined crops, disrupted conch harvests, and impeded normal tides for four days. Turkey vultures feasted on fish carcasses.

=== Eastern North America ===
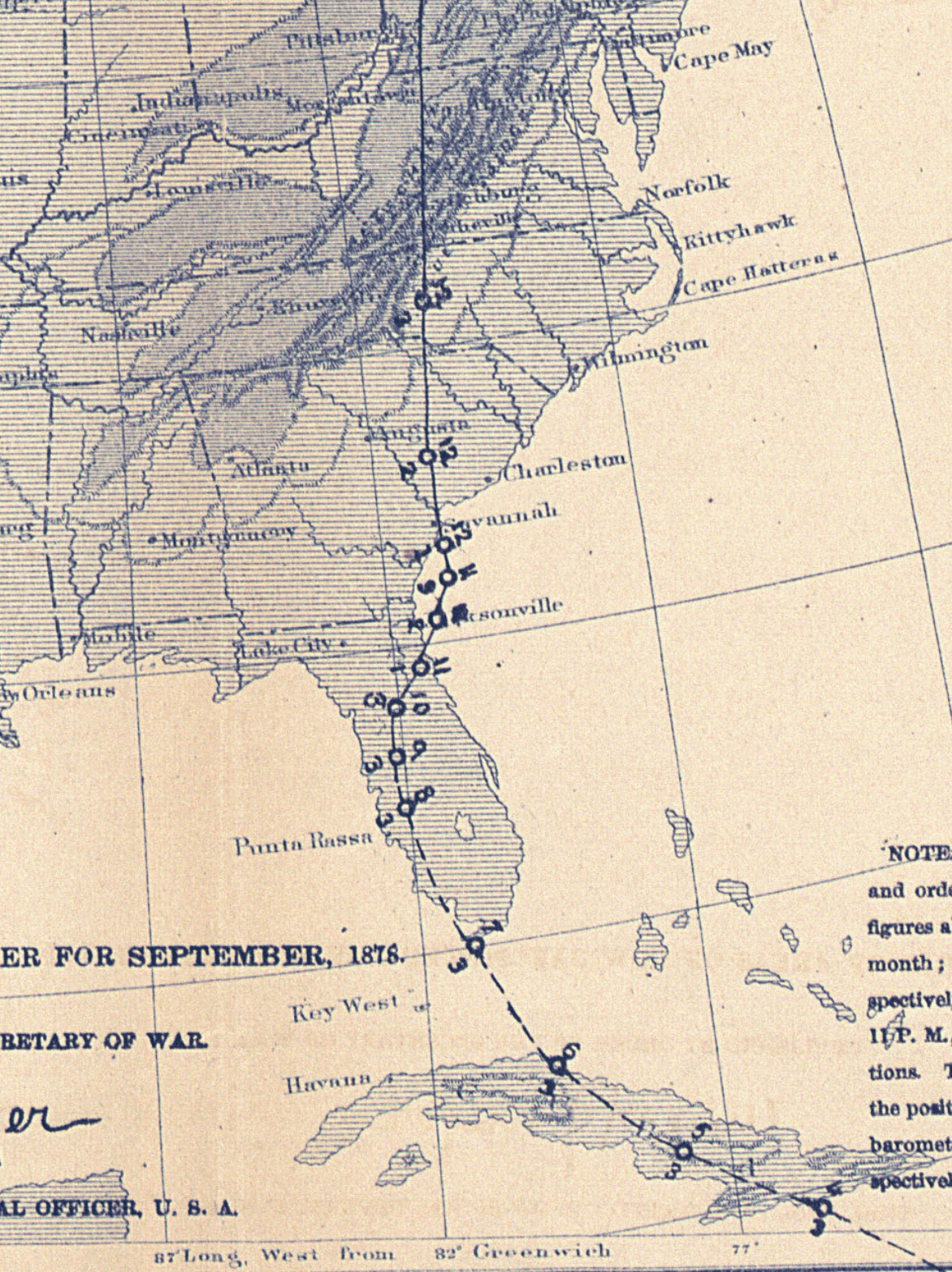
Map showing the track of the storm over Cuba and the Southeastern United States

On September 6 the United States Army Signal Corps—the agency responsible for weather forecasts and notices in the U.S. until 1891—first warned American interests of the storm, issuing what were labeled "cautionary signals" at cities such as Key West starting that day. As it meandered over or near Florida, the cyclone brought prolonged gales and torrential rains. Wind gusts to 60 mph (97 km/h) and elevated tides battered coastal sites such as Key West, Biscayne Bay, and Sarasota for almost a week, enhanced in part by the sprawling storm and ambient pressures from the ridge. The storm generated "extreme rainfalls" and a "thorough soaking" at many points, according to hurricane historian Jay Barnes. A series of factors amplified the storm, including its erratic trek, a pair of wetter-than-average years, wind-driven tides, and copious precipitation in its outer rainbands. These led to widespread flooding, pushing Lake Okeechobee over its rim. The rains accompanying the storm were such that new ponds formed in normally dry spots.

In Central Florida the Kissimmee River spilled over its banks several miles in Okeechobee County, near Fort Basinger, forcing boat travel for 30 mi (48 km) between there and Fort Myers. A chronicler of the area's history a century later wrote that locals dubbed the cyclone "the great hurricane" for its aftermath. A sheet of water covered all but the highest land to a depth of 5 ft (1.5 m) or more, obscuring markers such as Fisheating Creek and partly submerging cattle. Watercourses in south-central Florida rose rapidly to hitherto-unknown levels, with the Peace and Calooshatchee rivers reaching or exceeding the 14-foot (4.3 m) mark. Riparian flooding affected communities such as Fort Meade, immersing farms and severing bridges. Water levels reached the peaks of homes and "insulators on some of the telegraph poles", as detailed in an account published by the Sunland Tribune in Tampa. High tides also engulfed waterfronts, with over 1 ft (0.30 m) of water filling streets in Key West and snarling shipping. In Jacksonville tides seeped onto roads, flooding stores and turning streets into canals. At St. Augustine water lapped at the foot of houses, and at Mayport floods swallowed the countryside. At the former citizens esteemed the storm "the worst that has ever been there", as stated by the Sunland Tribune.

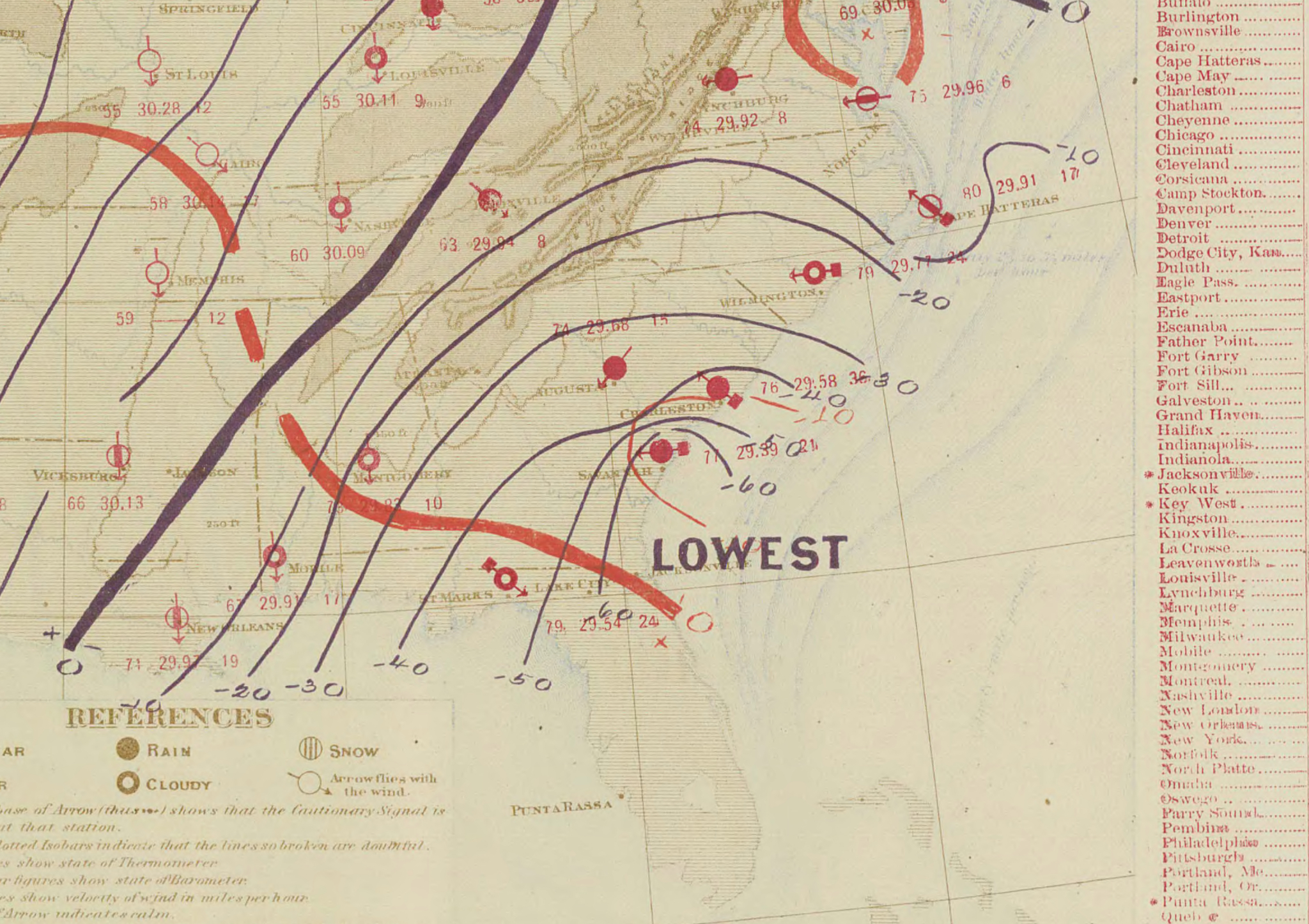
Surface weather map showing the storm along the Georgia coastline on September 12, just south of Savannah

Strong winds statewide downed telegraph lines, trees, and old or weak structures. In the Tampa Bay area winds dismantled a commissary, some shacks, a few churches, and an unfinished Masonic Hall, with Brandon among the spots affected. The storm felled various trees—particularly pines and chinaberries—throughout the area, including on the Pinellas peninsula, snarling wires and almost barring streets. Wind damage extended inland across the state, consisting of shattered signs, storefront windows, and fences. A tree fatally crushed a woman at Lake City. Fallen vegetation, including large trees, cluttered streets, city plazas, and other public places across the First Coast. Winds toppled, blew apart, or shifted diverse structures in multiple communities, including Franklintown and Mayport; among the razed edifices was a lighthouse at the St. Johns River outlet. Hurricane-force winds lasted 40 hours in some areas, compounding the damage, though wind estimates may have had a high bias. Northeasterly gales wrecked several ships along the coastline from Cape Canaveral to Amelia Island, including three near Mosquito Inlet, as well as small craft near Jacksonville; other vessels foundered or were dismasted up and down the seaboard, with one death. Several Central Florida counties, including Hillsborough, tallied considerable rice and sugarcane losses, with the heaviest damage to the former along the Alafia River. Downpours also inflicted vast losses to cotton in the Gainesville area. The storm destroyed tropical and other fruits—notably oranges, avocados, and bananas—all over the state, with especially severe losses to the former on Key West and at Chokoloskee in the Everglades.

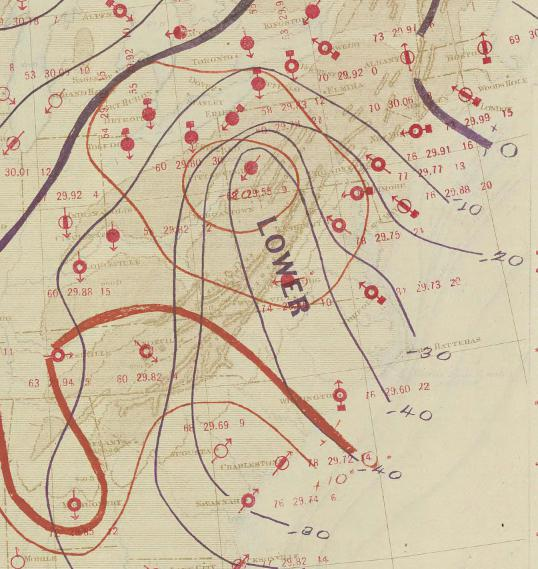
Surface weather map showing the storm near the eastern Great Lakes region on September 13

Brushing Georgia and the Carolinas, the storm caused the highest tides locally since a major hurricane 24 years earlier. The tides harmed rice fields on Butler Island and in the Savannah area, plaguing planters with "great" losses—estimated at over $300,000—along the Savannah, Ogeechee, and Black rivers, where 2–3 ft (0.61–0.91 m) of water covered plantations. In the South Carolina Lowcountry some rice plantations resembled "a sheet of water", notably on the Combahee and Ashepoo rivers, as per the Georgia Weekly Telegraph, Journal and Messenger. Persistent gales antedating the storm rocked the littoral Southeast for days, ushering in tidal surges over the Sea Islands and their vicinity. The crew of the barque Tuiske, five in all, drowned while departing Tybee Island in a longboat. The highest winds in the coastal Southeast beyond Florida raked Cape Lookout, North Carolina, which measured 61 mph (98 km/h), with little wind damage resulting there and in nearby towns, apart from prostrate barriers and trees. Rainwater gushed through local alleyways, bearing away various goods in places such as Wilmington, while overflowing streams and tides overran even raised locales, with crop losses up to 50% near the Cape Fear River. Offshore hurricane winds rolled the ship City of New York for 40 hours, and many vessels went aground on the North Carolina shore.

Vigorous winds extended far from the center, reaching as far inland as the Great Lakes region and north along the Atlantic coast. Gales extended into the neighboring Mid-Atlantic, where Richmond, Virginia, observed some of its strongest winds on record, along with broken tree limbs, chimneys, and power lines. Widespread winds over 40 mph (64 km/h) swept the seafront up to New York City, with a peak of 46 mph (74 km/h) at Cape May, New Jersey. Windstorms spread desolation along the Hudson Valley, leveling a half-done icehouse in Coxsackie, killing its owner and injuring his sons. The Hudson River brimmed over, flooding piers and docks. Strong winds uprooted many apple and peachtrees, with great losses to buckwheat, corn, and grapes in the bordering countryside. At Coney Island, New York, the storm generated 15-foot (4.6 m) surf, surpassing a storm the previous April. The sea crumpled bathhouses, and a pavilion near Atlantic Garden was isolated by high water. The storm acted as a spectacle, drawing 1,000 sightseers from nearby Manhattan Beach, a few hundred of whom waded offshore. In Virginia many boats washed ashore or were impaired, but the worst storm damage was sustained from a tornado outbreak that stretched into the Carolinas, spawning nine or more twisters—at least five of which were serious—killing three people and injuring at least 18 others. (Note: An outbreak is generally defined as a group of at least six tornadoes (the number sometimes varies slightly according to local climatology) with at most a six-hour gap between individual tornadoes. An outbreak sequence, prior to (after) the start of modern records in 1950, is defined as a period of no more than two (one) consecutive days without at least one significant (F2 or stronger) tornado.)

Railway deaths by area
Name	Country	Status	Source(s)
Charles B. McCormick	United States	stoker	
George Brown	United States	driver	
George Hoffman	United States	stoker	
Isaac Gensheimer	United States	brakeman	
John Bauer	United States	stoker	
Mike Cahill	United States	brakeman	
J. Mulcahy	United States	driver	
Richards	Canada	driver	
Roberts	United States	stoker	
S. McCabe	United States	driver	
U. B. McDowell	United States	brakeman	
Wheeler	United States	stoker	
Sources cited in text.

Farther north, the storm spread prolific rains over middle Appalachia, attended by record-breaking floods—and the worst weather in years—over parts of Pennsylvania, West Virginia, and Ohio. Daily rainfall peaked at 8 in (200 mm) in Steubenville, Ohio, and 7 in (180 mm) in Youngstown. Rivers across the region quickly attained flood stage, with a 24-hour rise of 16 ft (4.9 m) in the Ohio near Steubenville. Floods also ravaged the Virginia Piedmont, causing an unclear number of deaths. Homes, trees, dams, and crops were swept away. Water levels in the James River near Lynchburg, Virginia, rose 10 in (250 mm) an hour, dismaying local residents, including merchants in low areas who secured their wares. Localized freshwater flooding occurred along the James River in Henrico County. The Kanawha River climaxed the highest in 17 years, with its tributary, the New, breaking previous benchmarks by 5 ft (1.5 m). Not since 1837 had some areas in Ohio seen similar flooding. Floods in the Mahoning River and other water bodies inundated numerous communities, sweeping away riverfront homes, bridgeworks, mills, a furnace, dams, tents, and other structures, along with sundry waterborne objects. Bridge losses—30 in all—in Mahoning County, Ohio, alone totaled $100,000, with 100 families homeless in Youngstown. Similar monetary losses were reported from other individual locations, such as Geneva and Meadville, Pennsylvania. In Baltimore and Annapolis, Maryland, floodwater swept over docks and streets to a depth of several feet.

Onrushing waters overswept regional transportation links, swamping a 20-mile (32 km) railroad embankment segment, along with 50 mi (80 km) of railroads. The torrents scoured cropland, killed several hundred livestock, and gouged out track beds, buckling trains. Washouts or landslides killed three railroad personnel on the Chesapeake and Ohio Railway; at least one on the Panhandle Route near Reeds Mill, Ohio; four on the Erie and Pittsburgh Railroad near Jamestown, Pennsylvania; two near Barboursville, West Virginia; and three more on the Atlantic and Great Western Railroad near Meadville, along with a train engineer on an unnamed line near Cannelton, West Virginia. Multiple employees underwent injuries including arm and leg fractures. Additional deaths from drowning took place: one near Painesville, Ohio, when a steamer ran aground; two more in Mill Creek near Erie, Pennsylvania; a third near Meadsville; and two along the New River near Cannelton. Additionally, an indirect death ensued when an alcoholic scanning the floods tottered off a bridge near Geneva. Waters rose to record levels in Chagrin Falls, Ohio, and many other places along the Pennsylvania–Ohio border, turning entire areas into a "vast lake", as defined by the Monthly Weather Review. The waters covered low ground, carrying off sheep, haybales, fences, lumber, and other objects. Stormwater removed a 100-foot (30 m) pier segment in Oswego, New York. Due to the floods, the tempest was recalled as the "Hurricane of '78".

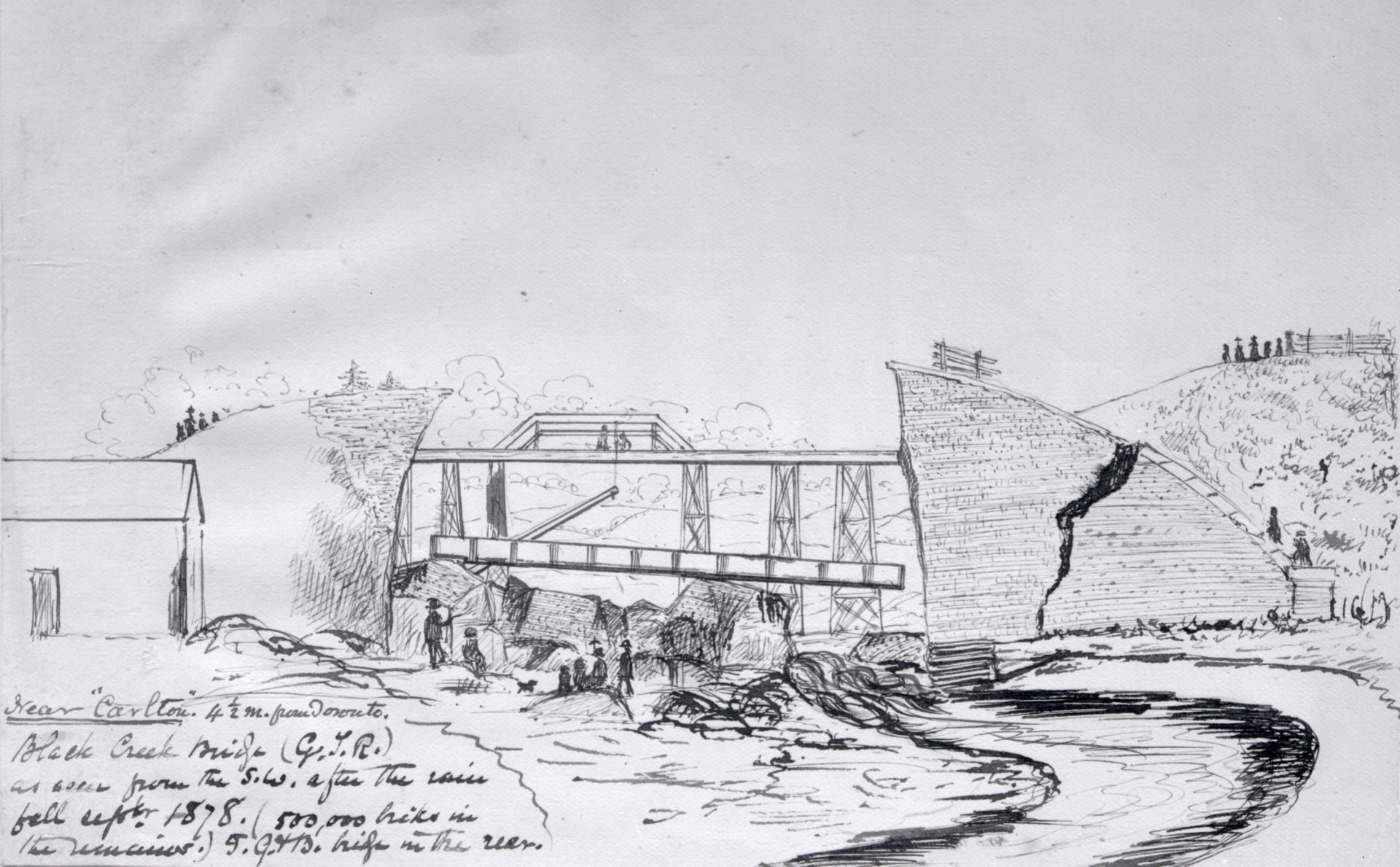
Illustration showing a collapsed bridge in Toronto, Ontario, following the storm

As the remnants of the system entered Canada, seafarers on Lakes Ontario and Erie reported the harshest storm in more than three decades. Several areas in Quebec and Ontario reported gale-force winds, rainstorms, and inclement weather. At Kingston blustery winds downed trees and fences. The storm dropped heavy rainfall over southern Ontario, with totals nearing 5 in (130 mm) while rains were ongoing. In Toronto 5.01 in (127 mm) fell in less than a day, the most in 36 years. The Don River ascended 8 ft (2.4 m) higher than usual, afflicting Toronto with up to $50,000 in flood damage, the heaviest in its history. The river overspread its banks, removing a few bridges and much of a third, the debris of which massed 20 ft (6.1 m) deep in a pile by the Grand Trunk Railway. The deluge uplifted sidewalks, soaked personal belongings, and formed potholes in roads, while badly damaging The Esplanade. Trains suspended service due to washouts as well. Four individuals drowned in Toronto itself, and four others were extricated from an adrift bridge. One more flood-related death occurred at Galt, one at Markham, three at Brampton, and one at Lindsay. Floods in and near these areas, such as at Meadowville (now Meadowvale), ruptured dams, damaging businesses, factories, and homes; several families had to be evacuated by boat. Brampton alone reported losses of at least $10,000, with most of its business district submerged. Floodwaters also effaced roads, killed cattle, and swelled streams to unprecedented levels, which The Globe compared to "a miniature Niagara". Not a single bridge remained in or around Scarborough, where farmers were unable to sell their crops due to the closure of markets and gardeners overcharged customers. Rising water raised fears of a dike breach and shipping casualties at Port Dalhousie. At Picton gales capsized a schooner, but without deaths. Rough weather unmoored, beached, or otherwise damaged a number of other vessels, mostly slightly.

==== Tornado outbreak ====
Confirmed tornadoes by Fujita rating
FU	F0	F1	F2	F3	F4	F5	Total
4	?	1	4	?	?	?	≥ 9

Prior to 1990, there is a likely undercount of tornadoes, particularly E/F0–1, with reports of weaker tornadoes becoming more common as population increased. A sharp increase in the annual average E/F0–1 count by approximately 200 tornadoes was noted upon the implementation of NEXRAD Doppler weather radar in 1990–1991. (Note: Historically, the number of tornadoes globally and in the United States was and is likely underrepresented: research by Grazulis on annual tornado activity suggests that, as of 2001, only 53% of yearly U.S. tornadoes were officially recorded. Documentation of tornadoes outside the United States was historically less exhaustive, owing to the lack of monitors in many nations and, in some cases, to internal political controls on public information. Most countries only recorded tornadoes that produced severe damage or fatalities. Significant low biases in U.S. tornado counts likely occurred through the early 1990s, when advanced NEXRAD was first installed and the National Weather Service began comprehensively verifying tornado occurrences.) 1974 marked the first year where significant tornado (E/F2+) counts became homogenous with contemporary values, attributed to the consistent implementation of Fujita scale assessments. (Note: The Fujita scale was devised under the aegis of scientist T. Theodore Fujita in the early 1970s. Prior to the advent of the scale in 1971, tornadoes in the United States were officially unrated. Tornado ratings were retroactively applied to events prior to the formal adoption of the F-scale by the National Weather Service. While the Fujita scale has been superseded by the Enhanced Fujita scale in the U.S. since February 1, 2007, Canada used the old scale until April 1, 2013; nations elsewhere, like the United Kingdom, apply other classifications such as the TORRO scale.) Numerous discrepancies on the details of tornadoes in this outbreak exist between sources. The total count of tornadoes and ratings differs from various agencies accordingly. The list below documents information from the most contemporary official sources alongside assessments from Grazulis.

Confirmed tornadoes – Thursday, September 12, 1878 (Note: All dates are based on the local time zone where the tornado touched down; however, all times are in Coordinated Universal Time and dates are split at midnight CST/CDT for consistency.)
F#	Location	County / Parish	State	Time (UTC)	Path length	Width (Note: The listed width values are primarily the average/mean width of the tornadoes, with those having known maximum widths denoted by ♯. From 1952 to 1994, reports largely list mean width whereas contemporary years list maximum width. Values provided by Grazulis are the average width, with estimates being rounded down (i.e. 0.5 mi (0.80 km) is rounded down from 880 yards to 800 yards.)	Damage
F2	Between Clover Hill and Summit	Chesterfield	VA	Unknown	8 mi (13 km)	100 yd (91 m)	≥$1,000
F2	Many homes were wrecked, with eight injuries. All articles in the path were ruined, and wooded swaths were left barren, with trees up to 2 ft (0.61 m) wide hurled several hundred yards. An orchard with hundreds of trees was leveled, along with fences, an icehouse, a carriage house, barns, stables, and up to 50 beehives.						
F1	Short Pump	Hanover	VA	Unknown	15 mi (24 km)	125 yd (114 m)	Unknown
F1	This tornado "mowed down" trees "as though they had been cut down with some powerful scythe", some of which it threw 1/2 mi (0.80 km), local media stated. Personal items were found miles away, and no debris remained in the path. The tornado also destroyed homes, including a sturdy log dwelling.						
F2	ENE of Goldsboro	Wayne	NC	11:45–?	5 mi (8.0 km)	100 yd (91 m)	Unknown
F2	2 deaths – A few farms and much timber were leveled. About 1,200 chickens were shorn of feathers. A man perished instantly, and a member of his family was fatally injured, dying days afterward. One of the dead was carried far, debris was strewn countywide, and farm animals and dogs were killed. There were three—possibly four—injured.						
FU	SE of Petersburg	Dinwiddie	VA	18:00–?	Unknown	Unknown	Unknown
FU	Details are unknown.						
F2	E of Ford's Depot	Dinwiddie	VA	18:20–?	Unknown	70 yd (64 m)	Unknown
F2	Dwellings and a barn were flattened, along with trees.						
FU	W of Burkeville	Nottoway	VA	Unknown	Unknown	Unknown	Unknown
FU	Trees were sheared off.						
F2	Bosher's Dam	Henrico	VA	Unknown	Unknown	100 yd (91 m)	Unknown
F2	1 death – Outbuildings and small homes were ripped apart, with heavy porch columns being carried over 1 mi (1.6 km). According to an observer, "all manner of vegetation mingled with muddy earth in the awful whirl". A mother was blown down while fleeing with her offspring, fatally crushing an infant. Seven injuries occurred.						
FU	Near Dover Mines	Goochland	VA	21:00–?	28 mi (45 km)	150 yd (140 m)	Unknown
FU	Details are unknown.						
FU	E of Warsaw	Duplin	NC	Unknown	Unknown	Unknown	Unknown
FU	Dubbed a "cyclone" by the Goldsboro Messenger, this tornado prostrated many trees and homes.						

== See also ==
- 1933 Trinidad hurricane – Also affected Trinidad with winds of hurricane intensity
- Hurricane Gordon – Generated severe flooding in Haiti and parts of Florida
- List of tropical cyclones spawning tornadoes
- Tropical Storm Fay (2008) – Brought prolific rains to peninsular Florida
