= Isla Aguada =

- Town
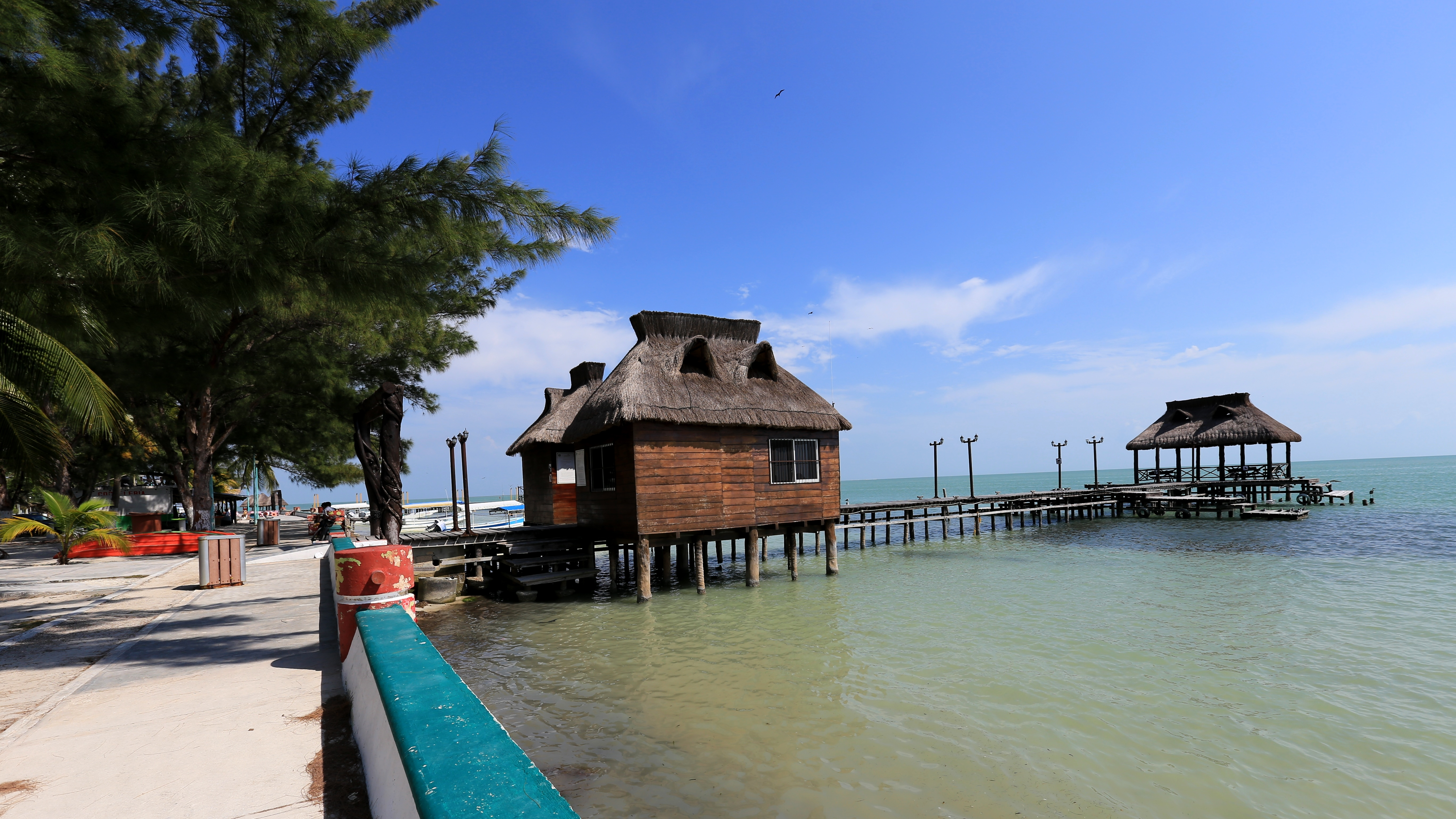

- Location within Campeche Location within Mexico
- Coordinates: 18°47′5″N 91°29′30″W
- Country: Mexico
- State: Campeche
- Municipality: Carmen Municipality
- First populated: 1762
- Elevation: 0 m (0 ft)

Population (2010)
  - Total: 6,204
- Demonym: Aguadeño
- Time zone: UTC-6
  - Summer (DST): UTC-5

Isla Aguada is a town in the Carmen municipality, in the state of Campeche, Mexico. The town is located in the tip of the Palmar Peninsula, about 40 km from the seat of the Carmen municipality, Ciudad del Carmen, and 90 km from the capital of the state, Campeche. Isla Aguada is surrounded in the south by the Sabancuy River and the Laguna de Términos and in the north by the Gulf of Mexico.

As of 2010, the population of Isla Aguada consisted of a total of 6,204, of which 3,205 were male and 2,999 female.

== History ==
Isla Aguada was a refuge for pirates after attacking shipments or nearby ports until 1762, when Governor Don Bernardo Sáenz Montero directed a regiment in order to send off the pirates. This mission was successful, as merchandise was recovered and some prisoners were taken.

It is popular belief that the first settlers of Isla Aguada, at those times called Puerto Escondido, were the soldiers sent to end piracy. Inhabitants fleeing from the Caste War of Yucatán were also one of the first population groups to arrive at Puerto Escondido. During the end of the 19th century and beginning of the 20th century, a lighthouse was built in order to receive the Spanish, French and English ships that arrived to Puerto Escondido, which traded marseille tiles and clay jars full of olives and wine for gum, precious woods and sea turtles. The neoclassical-style lighthouse was built in 1907 and stands 18 meters (59 ft) high. The lighthouse was also part of a network of seven lighthouses along the states of Tamaulipas, Veracruz, Campeche and Yucatán.

On December 1, 2020, Isla Aguada was added to the "Pueblos Mágicos" national program.

== Geography ==
Isla Aguada is part of the Área de Protección de Flora y Fauna Laguna de Términos. The area near Isla Aguada is specially known for its common bottlenose dolphins, which can be found in the Laguna de Términos throughout the year and attract tourism to the town.

Isla Pájaros (Bird Island) is an islet that receives local and migratory seabirds, such as ducks, herons, frigates and seagulls. Isla Pájaros is also home of the jabiru, which is the largest seabird of the Americas.

== Culture ==
=== Attractions ===
- The Parish of the Fisherman's Lord was built in 1977. It stands almost at the shore from the Laguna de Términos and was built to honor the "Señor del Pescador" (Fisherman's Lord).
- The Underwater Archaeology Museum is held in the lighthouse historically used for the arriving ships. In the museum are exposed pieces of shipwrecks, photographies of underwater findings, cannons and navigation instruments. It is also exhibits the history of Isla Aguada, the historical lighthouse network in which the lighthouse belonged and the flora and fauna of the nearby zones.

=== Festivities ===
One of the religious festivities of Isla Aguada is the Santa Cruz festivity, in honor of the Fisherman's Lord. From May 3 to 11, popular dances, pyrotechnical and mechanical games, launches decorated with balloons and multicolor papers and songs are made. The last day of the celebrations include a ride in the Laguna de Términos with the Fisherman's Lord's picture in the launches.

== Infrastructure ==
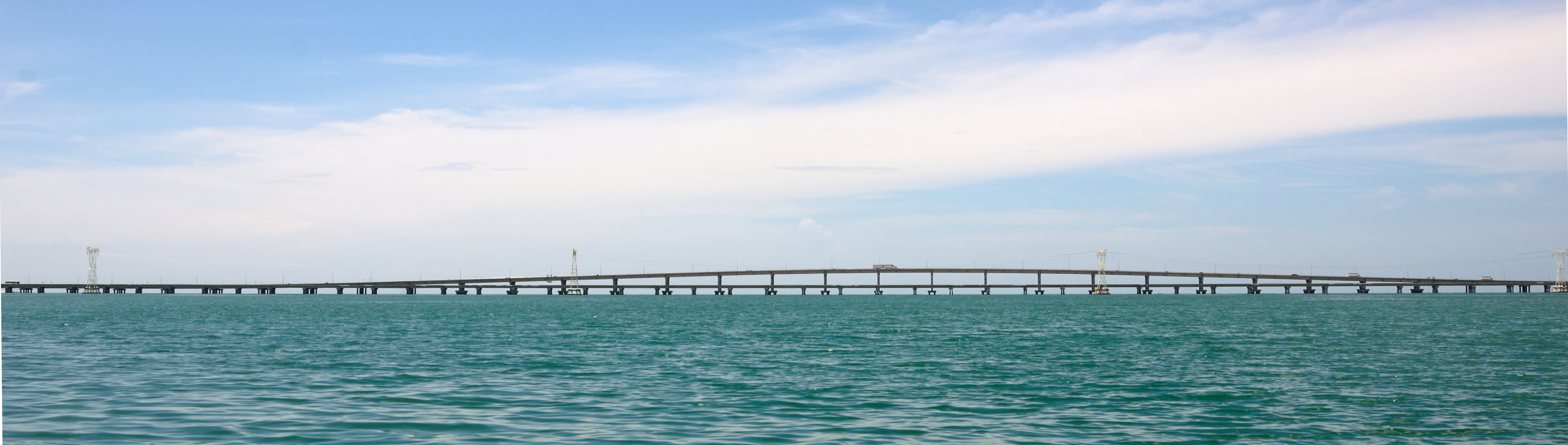
La Unidad Bridge in 2020

Isla Aguada is connected to Carmen Island by La Unidad Bridge, the second longest bridge in Mexico and fifth longest in Latin America, with a longitude of 3.2 km (2.0 mi). La Unidad Bridge connects the town of Isla Aguada and Puerto Real.

The bridge was first built in 1982, but due to deterioration in its structure a new bridge had to be built. This "Nuevo Puente La Unidad" (New "La Unidad" Bridge) was inaugurated in 2019 by the former Governor of Campeche Alejandro Moreno Cárdenas.
