= Montepío =

Village in Veracruz, Mexico

Coordinates: 18.642°N 95.098°W

Montepío Beach in Los Tuxtlas, Veracruz

Montepío is a small village on the Gulf Coast of Mexico, within the San Andrés Tuxtla municipality, Veracruz, 1 hour away from the major tourist center of Catemaco.

Situated at the confluence of two of the smaller rivers draining the San Martin Tuxtla volcano in the Sierra de Los Tuxtlas, the village is a vacation resort for mostly Mexican visitors.
