= 1886 Atlantic hurricane season =

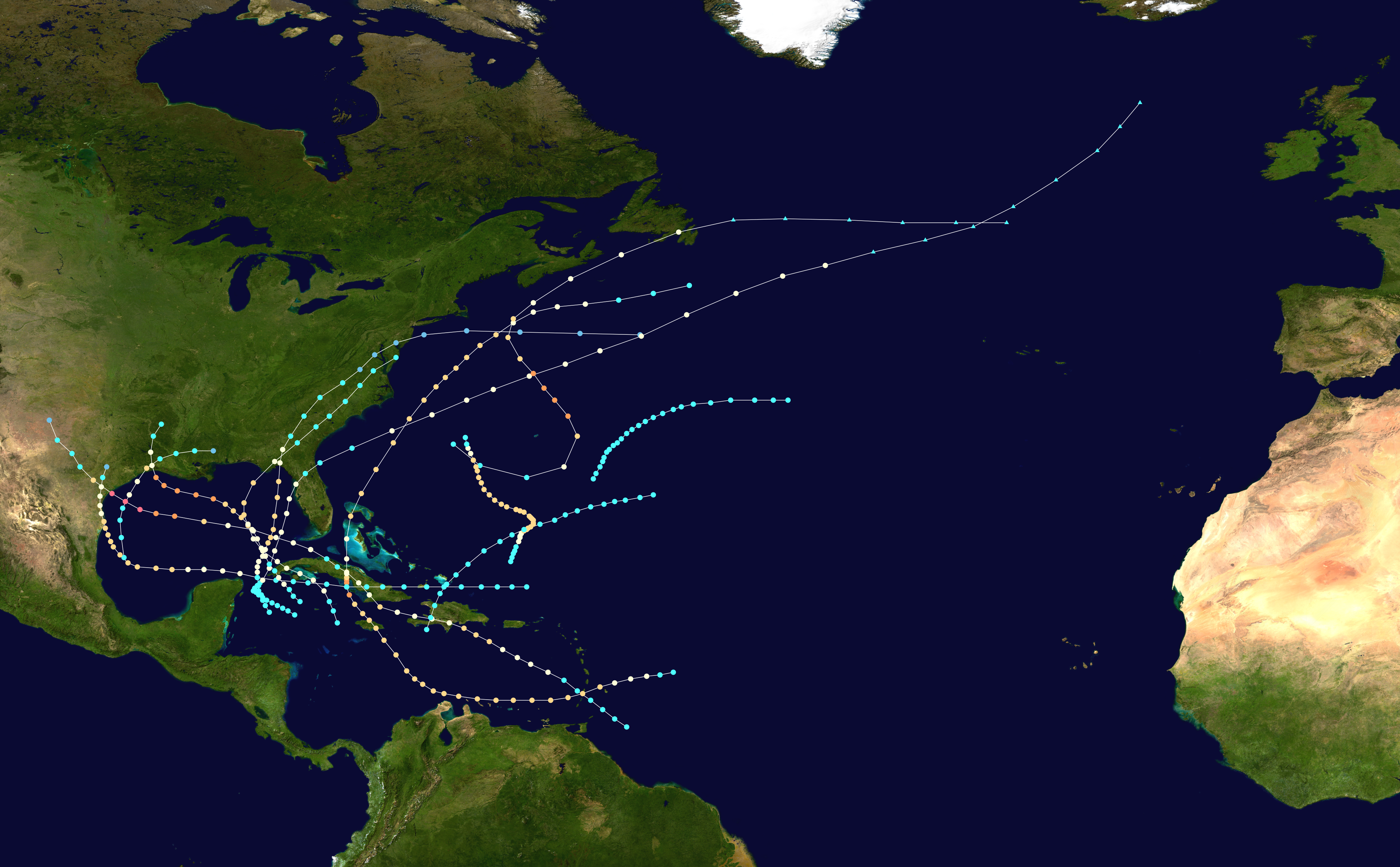
- Season summary map

Seasonal boundaries
- First system formed: June 13, 1886
- Last system dissipated: October 26, 1886

Strongest storm
- Name: "Indianola"
  - Maximum winds: 150 mph (240 km/h) (1-minute sustained)
  - Lowest pressure: 925 mbar (hPa; 27.32 inHg)

Seasonal statistics
- Total depressions: 12
- Total storms: 12
- Hurricanes: 10
- Major hurricanes (Cat. 3+): 4
- Total fatalities: >302
- Total damage: ~ $3.35 million (1886 USD)

Related articles
- List of Pacific hurricanes before 1900; 1880s Pacific typhoon seasons; Pre-1890 North Indian Ocean cyclone seasons

The 1886 Atlantic hurricane season included seven tropical cyclones that struck or moved across the United States at hurricane intensity, the most ever recorded. The season featured 12 known tropical storms, with a then-record tying 10 becoming hurricanes. Four of those cyclones became major hurricanes, (Note: A major hurricane is a storm that ranks as Category 3 or higher on the Saffir–Simpson hurricane wind scale.) the highest number until 1893. The season also had the most active June, and reached the modern seasonal average of hurricanes by mid-August. This occurred once more in 1893, and has remained a distant record since. However, with the absence of modern satellites and other remote-sensing technologies, only storms that affected populated land areas or encountered ships at sea were documented. The actual total is likely higher with an average under-count bias estimate of zero to six tropical cyclones per year between 1851 and 1885 and zero to four per year between 1886 and 1910. The first system was initially observed on June 13 over the western Gulf of Mexico, while the final storm was last noted east-southeast of Bermuda on October 26.

The seventh and eleventh systems were first documented in 1996 by José Fernández-Partagás and Henry F. Diaz, in which they also proposed alterations to the known tracks of nearly all other 1886 storms. A 2000 reanalysis by meteorologist Ramón Pérez Suárez resulted in the sixth cyclone being retroactively upgraded to a major hurricane. Although early 21st century reviews of this season by the Atlantic hurricane reanalysis project did not add or remove any storms from the official hurricane database (HURDAT), they extended the duration of a few storms and upgraded the sixth system to major hurricane status. In 2014, climate researcher Michael Chenoweth's reanalysis study recommended the addition of one new storm to HURDAT, for a total of 13 cyclones in the 1886 season, as well as modifications to the tracks, duration, and intensity of several systems. However, Chenoweth's reanalysis is yet to be added to HURDAT.

Nearly all known cyclones of the 1886 season impacted land. The strongest cyclone, the fifth system (also known as the Indianola hurricane), peaked as a Category 4 hurricane on the present-day Saffir–Simpson scale. Passing through the Windward Islands and striking Hispaniola, Cuba, and Texas, the hurricane caused at least 75 fatalities and about $3.1 million (1886 USD; $98 million in 2025) in damage in Texas alone. (Note: All damage figures are in 1886 USD, unless otherwise noted) Between late June and early July, the season's third storm led to more than 21 deaths as it impacted Jamaica, Cuba, and Florida. Many countries and territories around the eastern and central Caribbean experienced the effects of the season's sixth cyclone in August, with at least five people killed on Saint Vincent. Also during that month, the seventh storm drowned five people over the Grand Banks of Newfoundland. The final hurricane to strike the United States, the tenth system, killed at least 196 people in Louisiana and Texas and inflicted about $250,000 ($7.9 million in 2025) in the eastern portions of the former alone. Collectively, the cyclones of the 1886 season caused more than $3.35 million in damage ($106 million in 2025) and over 302 fatalities.

== Seasonal summary ==
The 1886 season was approximately average, featuring 12 tropical storms compared to the more modern 1981–2010 annual average of 12.1. The number of hurricanes, however, was well above average, with 10 forming compared to the latest 1991–2020 annual average of 7.2. The number of major hurricanes—defined as Category 3 or higher on the modern Saffir–Simpson scale—was four; also above average compared to an average of 3.2. Several studies have also suggested that the 1883 eruption of Krakatoa may have played a significant role in the unusual and enhanced activity. Owing to deficiencies in surface weather observations at the time, the total number of tropical storms in 1886 was likely higher than 12. A 2008 study indicated that about three storms may have been missed by observational records due to scarce marine traffic over the open Atlantic Ocean, while Christopher Landsea in 2004 estimated an average under-count bias estimate of zero to six tropical cyclones per year between 1851 and 1885 and zero to four per year between 1886 and 1910. All but two of the storms in 1886 affected land at some point in the tropical stages of their life cycles. Of these, four hurricanes struck the island of Cuba, a record unsurpassed in any Atlantic hurricane season since at least 1851. According to the Cuban Meteorological Society, 1886 coincided with a highly active period (1837–1910) in which one hurricane struck the island every 9.25 years. Additionally, seven hurricanes struck or moved across the United States at that intensity, establishing another record single-season record. The years 1886–1887 combined featured nine hurricane landfalls in the United States, an unsurpassed total for consecutive seasons until 2004–2005. Hurricane activity centered on the Gulf of Mexico: six of the seven landfalls in 1886 (and 3 in 1887) occurred on the U.S. Gulf Coast, with no hurricanes making landfall along the Atlantic Seaboard.

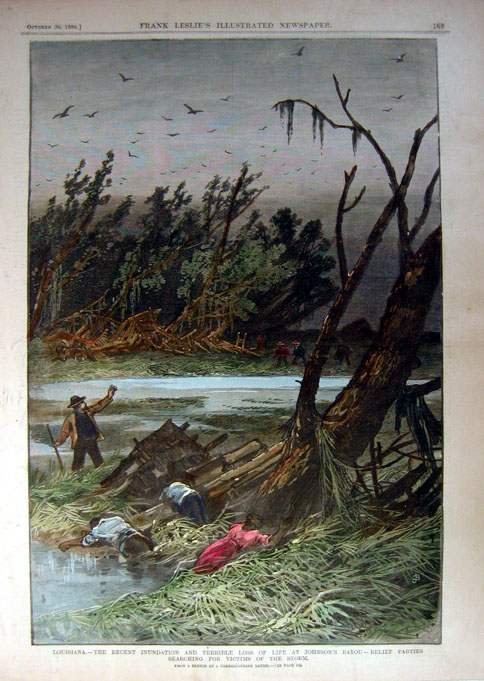
Corpses in Johnson Bayou, Louisiana, following the extraordinarily late October hurricane.

Although other storms may have gone undetected, tropical activity first began on June 13 with the formation of the first tropical storm over the western Gulf of Mexico. Two other storms formed before the end of the month and also reached the Gulf of Mexico. All three of the storms each attained hurricane intensity and eventually made landfall on the U.S. Gulf Coast with sustained winds of 100 mph (155 km/h). About two weeks later in mid-July, another storm formed over the western Caribbean moved northward before striking the west coast of Florida as a hurricane. This is after two earlier stronger storms had already done so in the state. Never before or since have so many hurricanes struck Florida in the same season before the month of September. Three storms, all of which attained major hurricane intensity, formed in close succession, over a span of eight days, in August. The first of these, the Indianola hurricane, was the strongest and most intense tropical cyclone of the season, striking multiple islands in the Greater Antilles before rapidly strengthening over the western Gulf of Mexico. It struck the U.S. state of Texas on August 20 with sustained winds of 150 mph (240 km/h), tying it with the 1932 Freeport hurricane for the strongest storm to do so. It was also one of the most intense to have struck the continental U.S., and the strongest in Texas measured solely by central pressure, at 925 mbar (27.3 inHg).

September was less active than August, featuring two hurricanes in the later half of the month. Both reached Category 2 intensity, while hurricane eight struck Texas at peak intensity about a month after the Indianola hurricane. Around the same time hurricane nine formed out to sea, and impacted several ships. About two weeks later, the final hurricane formed in early October and struck western Louisiana with winds of 120 mph (190 km/h). The hurricane then moved on to strike Texas shortly after, being the fourth and final to do so that year. Since records began in 1851, only two hurricanes have struck the state later into the season. Two additional tropical storms occurred in October, the second of which was last noted east-southeast of Bermuda on October 26, with no further activity confirmed afterward. Overall, the cyclones of the 1886 season collectively caused more than $3.35 million (1886 USD) in damage and over 302 fatalities.

The season's activity was reflected with an accumulated cyclone energy (ACE) rating of 166, the second highest total of the decade, behind only the following season. ACE is a metric used to express the energy used by a tropical cyclone during its lifetime. Therefore, a storm with a longer duration will have higher values of ACE. It is only calculated at six-hour increments in which specific tropical and subtropical systems are either at or above sustained wind speeds of 39 mph (63 km/h), which is the threshold for tropical storm intensity. Thus, tropical depressions are not included here.

== Systems ==
=== Hurricane One ===
- Category 2 hurricane (SSHWS)
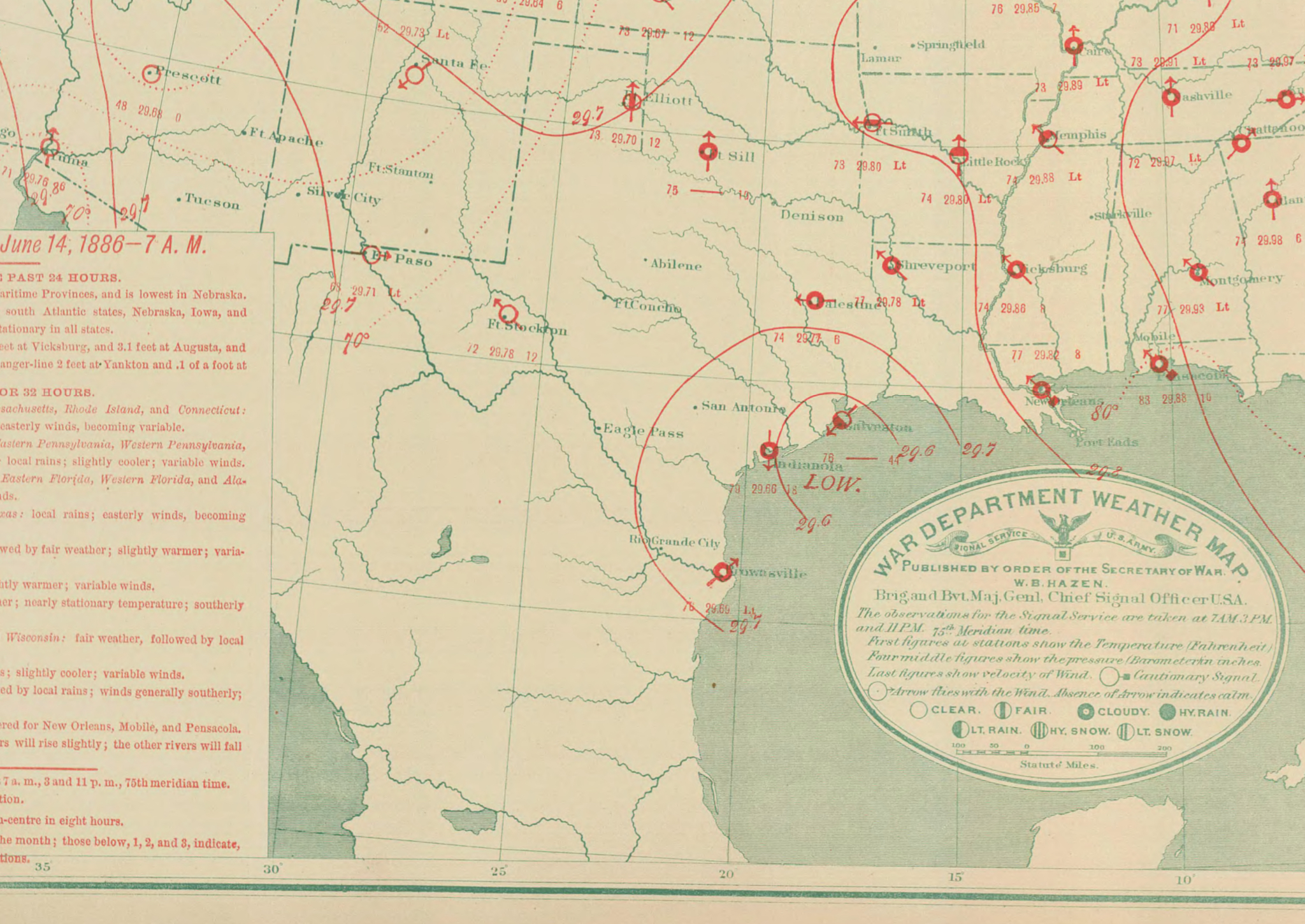
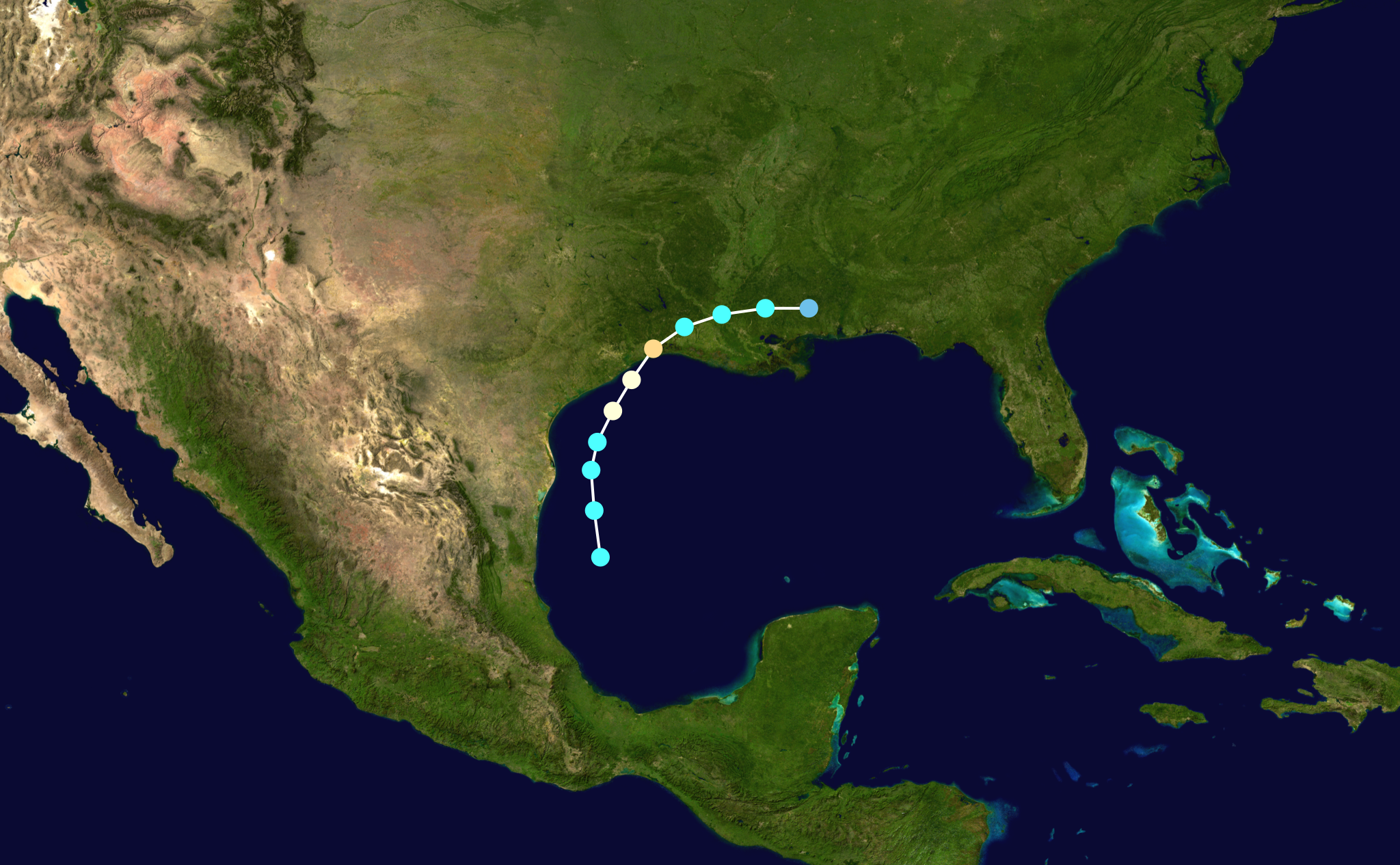
- Duration: June 13 – June 15
- Peak intensity: 100 mph (155 km/h) (1-min); <997 mbar (hPa)

Early in June, unsettled weather prevailed over the western Caribbean Sea, causing heavy rain and strong winds over Jamaica as early as June 7–8. However, ship reports and data from weather stations first confirmed that a low-pressure area formed off the coast of South Texas. Based on the data, HURDAT analyzed that a tropical storm formed about 140 mi (225 km) east-southeast of La Pesca, in the Mexican state of Tamaulipas, on the morning of June 13. Moving generally northward at first, the cyclone quickly intensified through the day as it gradually turned to the north-northeast, paralleling the Texas coast. By 06:00 UTC on June 14, the cyclone already attained hurricane status, and its parabolic path increasingly bent to the northeast. Around 16:00 UTC, the cyclone attained its peak intensity of 100 mph (155 km/h), equivalent to a modern-day Category 2 hurricane, and made landfall just east of High Island, Texas. The cyclone rapidly weakened as it headed inland to the east-northeast, crossing south-central Louisiana as a tropical storm on June 15. Reanalysis in the 1990s determined that it dissipated about 20 mi (30 km) east-southeast of Hattiesburg, Mississippi, by 18:00 UTC on June 15. Climate scientist Michael Chenoweth moved the development date of this cyclone back to June 7, as a tropical storm near Jamaica. The cyclone then crossed the Yucatán Peninsula prior to reaching the Gulf of Mexico.

As it passed just offshore, the hurricane produced strong winds from the east and northeast in Galveston, Texas, generating very high tides. Observers suggested that only the shifting of the winds prevented severe flooding, possibly the worst since a hurricane in 1875; even so, small boats sustained significant damage. Waterfront structures, a tramway, and a railroad were destroyed. Galveston recorded peak winds of 50 mph (85 km/h), and a barometer in town registered a minimum pressure of 997 mbar (29.43 inHg); as these conditions were recorded outside the storm's radius of maximum wind, the cyclone was likely stronger. Upon making landfall, the hurricane brought a 7-to-8 ft (2.1-to-2.4 m) storm tide and major flooding to Sabine Pass and its environs. Numerous structures and wharves were destroyed by wind or water, and winds tore roofs from houses. Fruit trees in the area lost much of their fruit. Saltwater intrusion extended several miles inland, imperiling livestock for want of freshwater. Across the state border in adjourning Louisiana, widespread flooding occurred at Calcasieu Pass, where a barge was stranded and schooners were wrecked. Half of the corn crop in southwest Louisiana was damaged. While losing intensity so rapidly after landfall that forecasters lost track of it, the storm generated prolific rainfall in its path across Southeast Texas and Louisiana, peaking at 21.4 in (544 mm) in Alexandria, Louisiana.

=== Hurricane Two ===
- Category 2 hurricane (SSHWS)
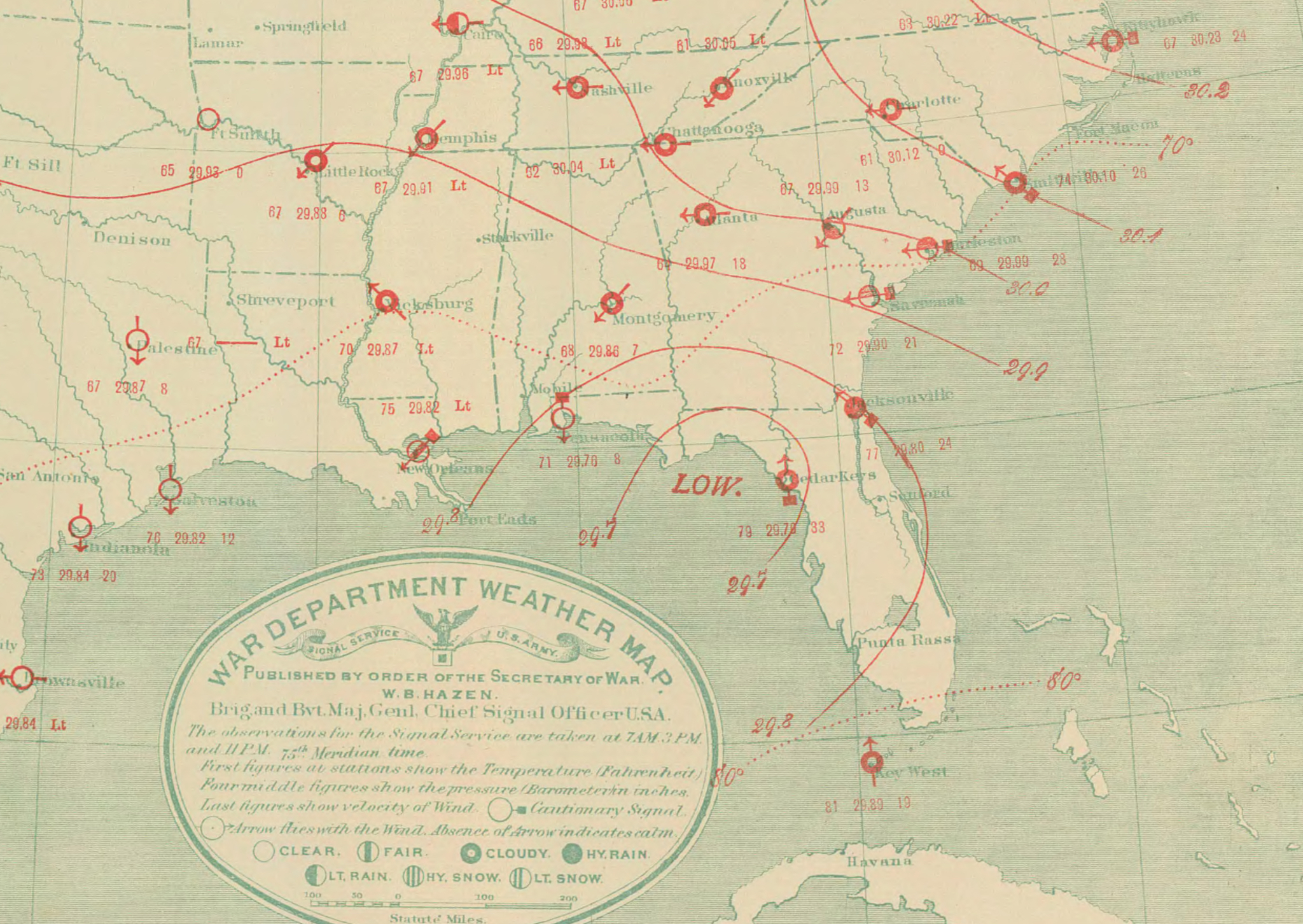
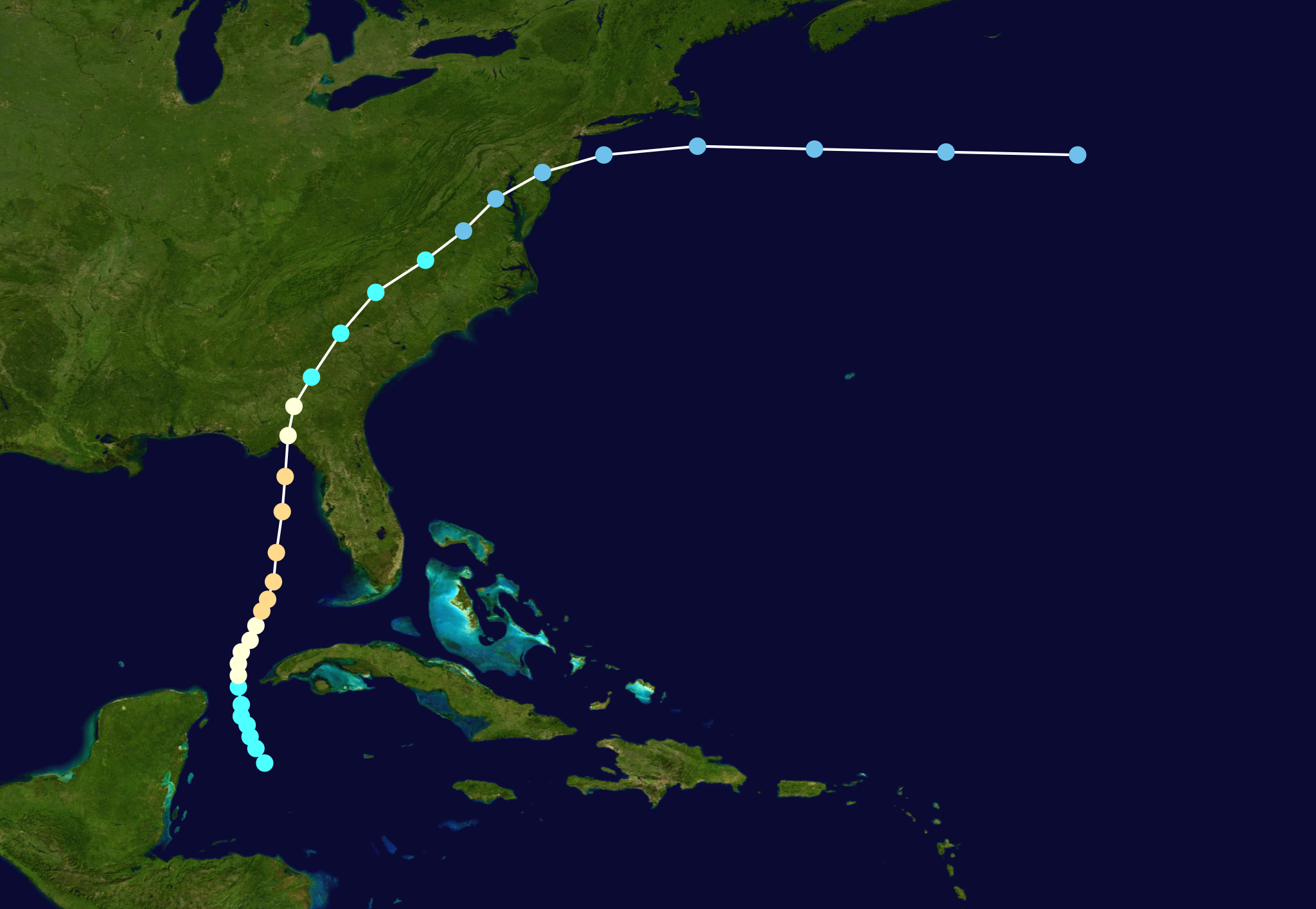
- Duration: June 17 – June 24
- Peak intensity: 100 mph (155 km/h) (1-min);

Little more than a day after the dissipation of the previous hurricane, a broad area of low pressure over the western Caribbean Sea developed into a tropical storm while centered about 180 mi (290 km) east-southeast of Punta Allen, Quintana Roo, Mexico. Over the next two days, the storm meandered toward and through the Yucatán Channel, gradually intensifying as it proceeded to the north-northwest and north. Late on June 18, the system attained hurricane status off the western tip of Pinar del Río Province, Cuba. The following day, the cyclone turned to the north-northeast, producing "severe gales" (47–54 mph, 76–87 km/h) over the waters off Cuba and Jamaica, as reported by ships. At 00:00 UTC on June 20, the storm reached its peak intensity of 100 mph (155 km/h), and shortly afterward its forward speed accelerated. At 11:00 UTC on June 21, the cyclone made landfall near St. Marks, Florida, as a Category 2 hurricane. The storm gradually decreased in intensity over the next day and a half as it crossed the Southeastern and Mid-Atlantic states. By 18:00 UTC on June 23, the system passed about 70 mi (115 km) southeast of New York City and curved to the east before dissipating a day later.

Over a six-day period, a long duration of heavy rainfall from the storm caused severe flooding over parts of western Cuba, killing an undetermined number of people in flash floods. Winds over the island were apparently modest, however, though the rain over Vuelta Abajo was the heaviest over a one-week span in 29 years. Several locations were underwater following the deluge. As it passed west of Key West, Florida, the cyclone produced strong southerly winds. At Cedar Key, gusts of 75–90 mph (121–145 km/h) toppled trees, signage and communications wires, but caused little structural damage. Between there and Apalachicola, above-normal tides covered low-lying streets and pushed ships onshore. Heaviest damages were concentrated in and near Apalachicola and Tallahassee. The storm produced minimal effects in the Jacksonville area, as hurricane-force winds were confined to the west of the Gainesville–Lake City area. The strongest sustained winds measured in Florida were below hurricane force—only 68 mph (109 km/h) at Cedar Key—but "high tides" affected much of the coastline near the point of landfall. Outside Florida, heavy rains, peaking at 5.44 in (138 mm), inundated streets in Lynchburg, Virginia, producing the then-wettest June on record at that place. A daily record for the month, 4.16 in (106 mm), also occurred in Washington, D.C.

In a 1949 report by meteorologist Grady Norton, the U.S. Weather Bureau—later the National Weather Service—considered the storm a "Great Hurricane", implying winds of at least 125 mph (201 km/h), though reassessments could find no evidence that the cyclone ever reached major hurricane status. Furthermore, Chenoweth's 2014 reanalysis study argued that the cyclone did not even strengthen into a hurricane, and that it became extratropical offshore the Mid-Atlantic region of the United States on June 23.

=== Hurricane Three ===
- Category 2 hurricane (SSHWS)
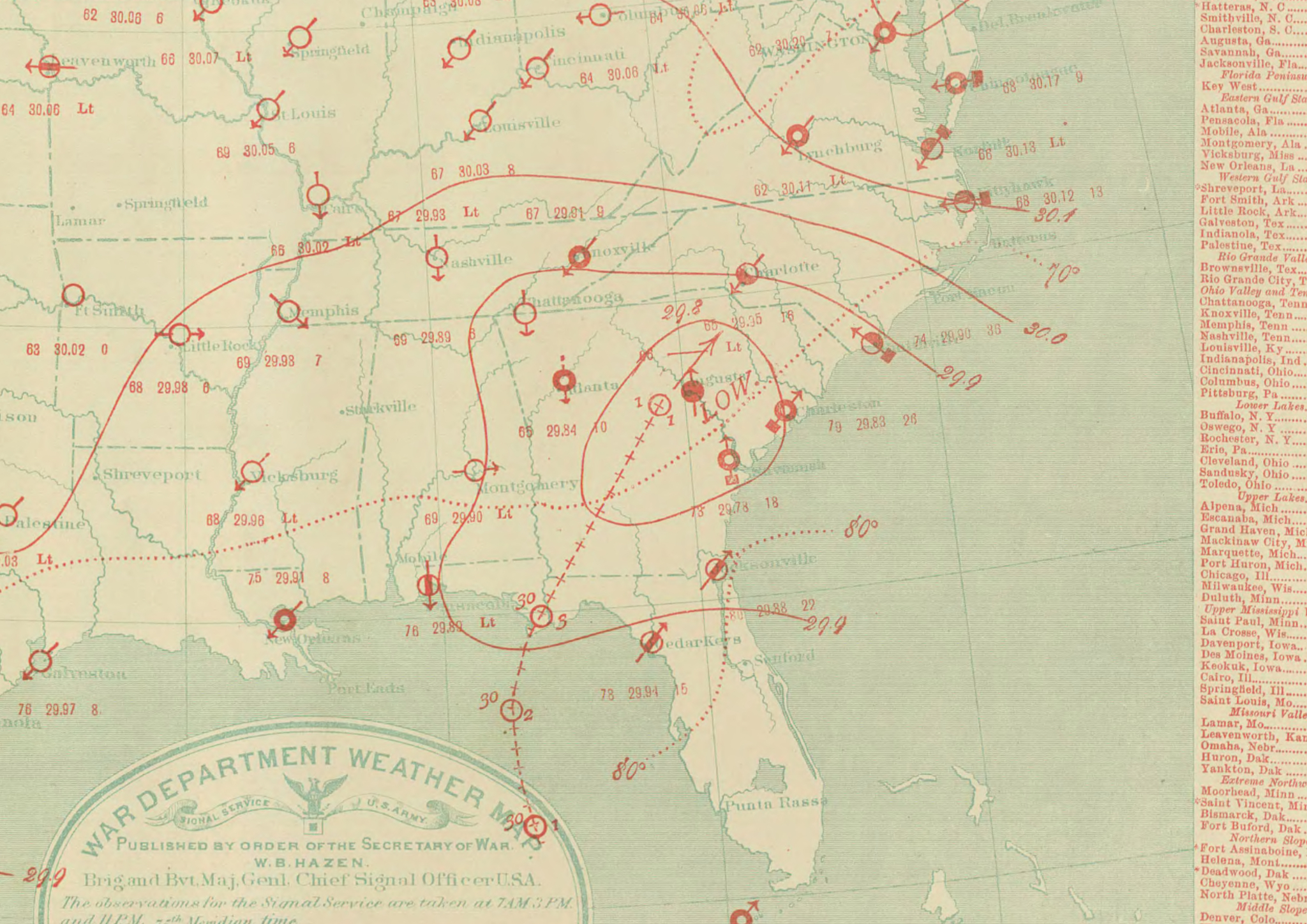
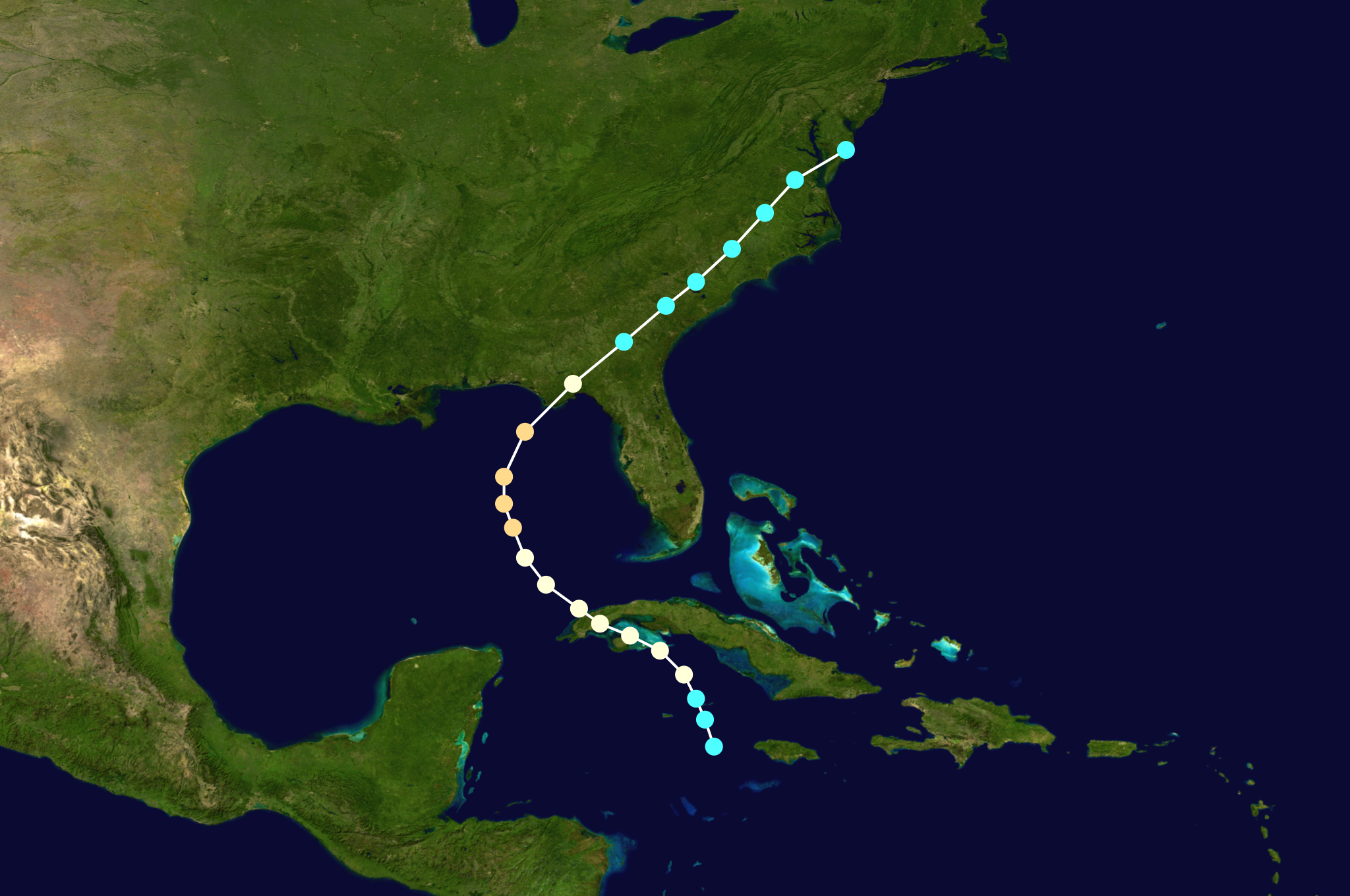
- Duration: June 27 – July 2
- Peak intensity: 100 mph (155 km/h) (1-min); <999 mbar (hPa)

Closely following the dissipation of the previous storm, yet another tropical storm developed about 90 mi (145 km) west of Negril, Jamaica, at 12:00 UTC on June 27. The system quickly strengthened as it headed north-northwest, acquiring hurricane intensity early the next day. Sharply turning to the west-northwest, the cyclone continued to intensify, reaching its first peak intensity of 90 mph (145 km/h) at 18:00 UTC on June 28. Maintaining force, it struck Pinar del Río Province, Cuba, later that day. On June 29, the cyclone weakened as it crossed western Cuba, but began restrengthening over the eastern Gulf of Mexico as its path turned northwestward. Early on June 30, the hurricane attained its second and strongest peak of 100 mph (155 km/h) as its path began curving to the north. Veering and accelerating to the northeast, the storm struck the Florida Panhandle near Indian Pass around 21:00 UTC that day. The cyclone weakened as it headed inland, losing its identity near Cedartown, Maryland, late on July 2. Chenoweth proposed that this storm actually developed east of Jamaica late on June 26 and intensified into a hurricane about 24 hours later.

In Jamaica, at least 18 deaths were attributed to the effects of the storm, and a ship west of the island experienced hurricane-force winds. While described as being of only "moderate intensity", the hurricane caused considerable damage to western Cuba, where homes were destroyed or lost their roofs and trees were prostrated; flooding was reportedly severe as well. Damage was concentrated in and near Batabanó and across Pinar del Río Province. Trece de la Coloma reported a minimum pressure of 999 mbar (29.49 inHg). Two drownings occurred when a ship capsized, and an unknown number of fatalities occurred on land in Cuba. In Florida, the eye of the cyclone passed over Apalachicola, which reported top winds of 70 mph (110 km/h). Homes in town lost their roofs, frame buildings collapsed, and several craft in the bay sank, killing some people. At Cedar Key, high tides undermined roadways, and winds of 47–54 mph (76–87 km/h) removed a warehouse from its foundation. Winds gusting to 80 mph (130 km/h) uprooted large trees and moved railroad cars in Tallahassee; one person perished in Jefferson County. "Considerable" destruction of crops occurred in parts of North Florida and adjacent Georgia. Farther north, in North Carolina, winds of 42–44 mph (68–71 km/h) affected Kitty Hawk and Fort Macon, respectively. Copious rains affected southeast Virginia over a two-day span, destroying railroad trestles and embankments. The James River crested 10 ft (3.0 m) above flood stage, flooding waterfront structures in Richmond and prompting evacuations.

=== Hurricane Four ===
- Category 1 hurricane (SSHWS)
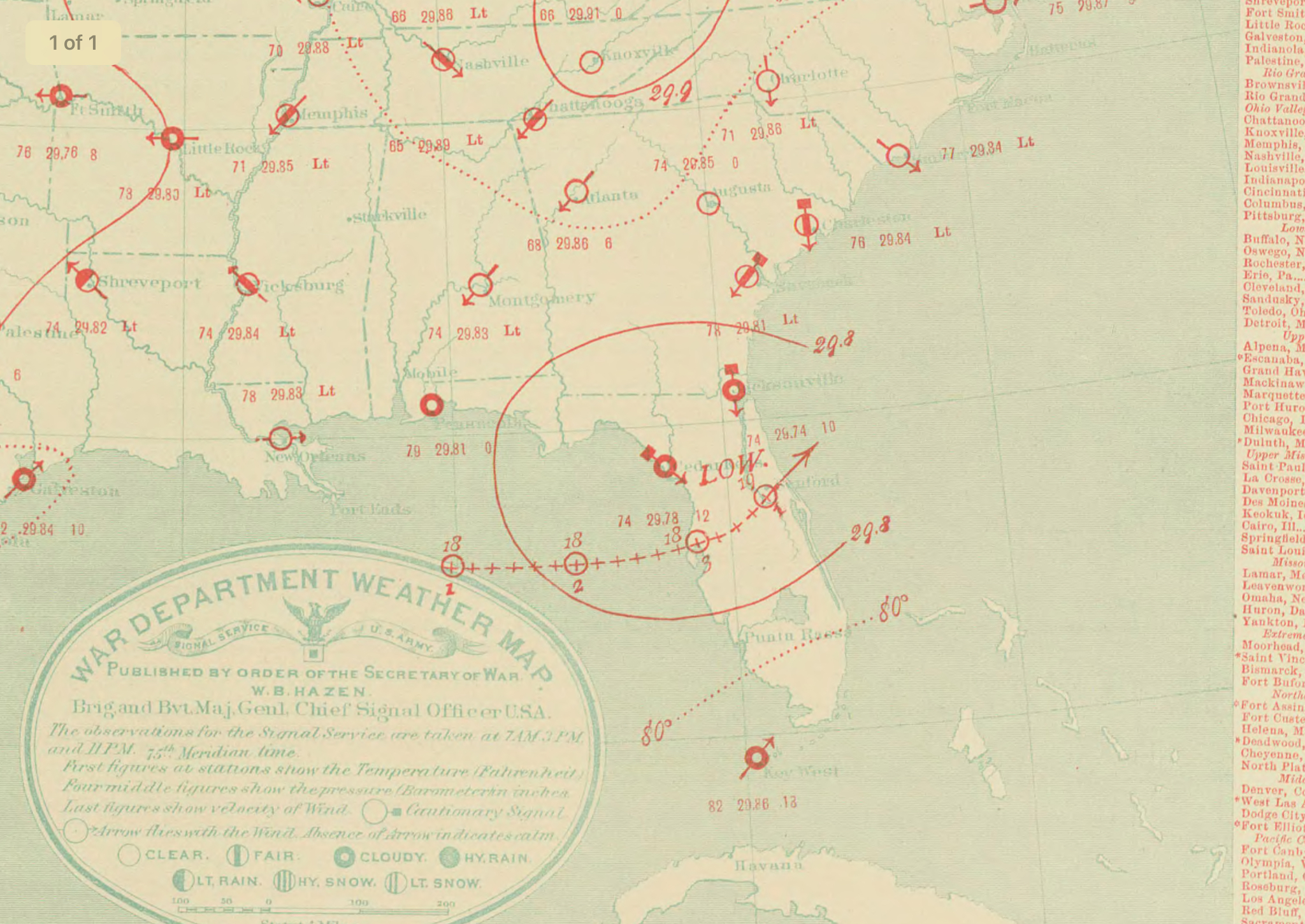
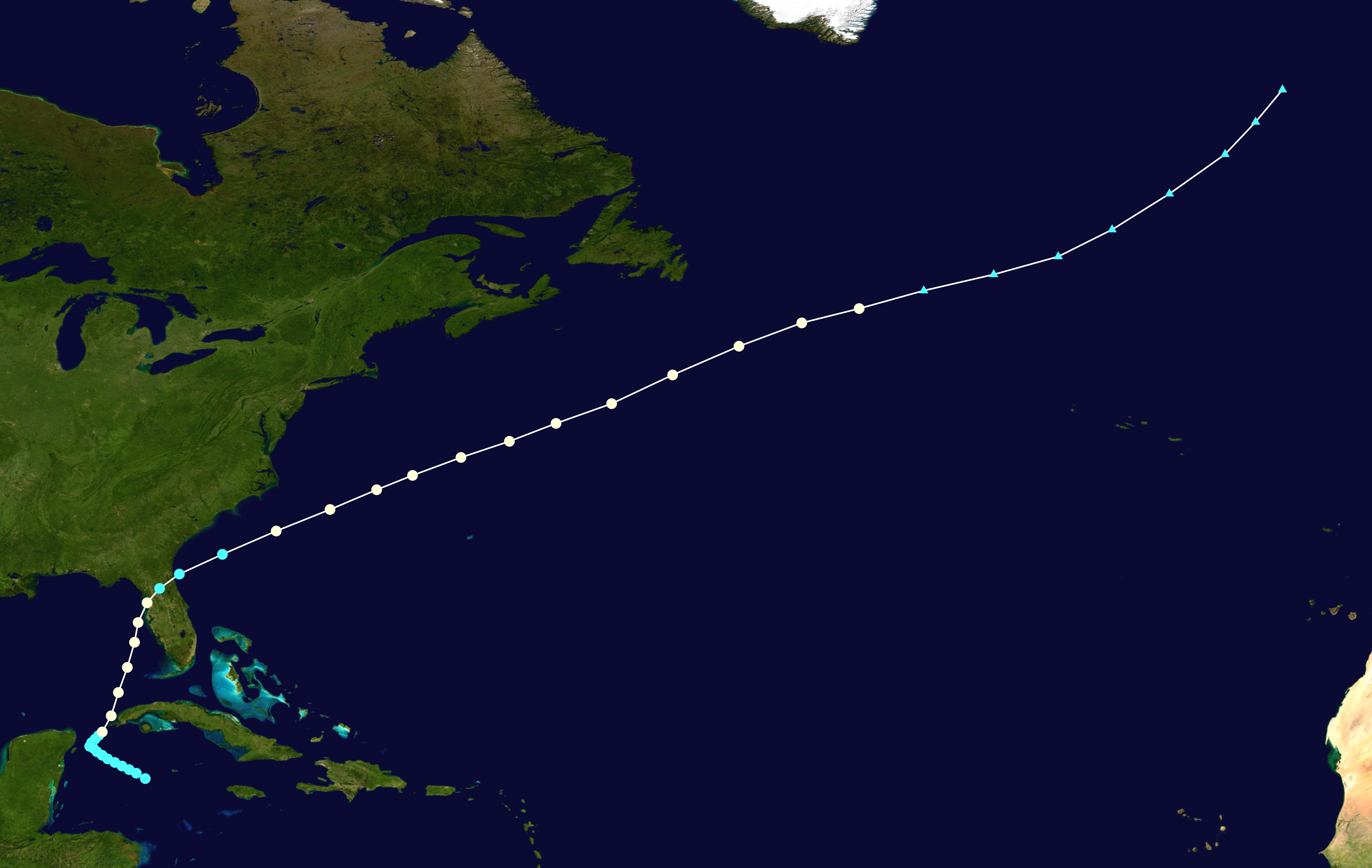
- Duration: July 14 – July 22
- Peak intensity: 85 mph (140 km/h) (1-min); ≤990 mbar (hPa)

After nearly two quiet weeks, the fourth tropical storm of the season developed about 105 mi (170 km) west-southwest of George Town, Cayman Islands, at 06:00 UTC on July 14. For two more days, the system drifted west-northwest, gradually strengthening. On July 16, the cyclone began turning to the northeast and accelerated. It reached hurricane status at 12:00 UTC on July 17 and passed just west of Cuba later that day. Its path then bent to the north-northeast, and early the next day, the storm attained winds of 80 mph (130 km/h) as its eye neared the west coast of the Florida peninsula. Around 01:00 UTC on July 19, the hurricane made landfall near Ozello, at that intensity. The storm soon lost hurricane status as it swiftly turned to the east-northeast, briskly crossing North Florida en route to the Atlantic. At 00:00 UTC on July 20, the storm recovered hurricane status while centered about 140 mi (225 km) south-southeast of Cape Lookout, North Carolina, and six hours later attained its second and strongest peak of 85 mph (140 km/h). The storm acquired extratropical characteristics early on July 23, and after curving to the northeast over the far north Atlantic, it dissipated at 18:00 UTC on July 24.

The 2014 reanalysis study by Chenoweth suggested that this storm formed about 30 hours later than indicated by HURDAT, but closer to Jamaica. Although it bypassed the island to the west, the cyclone generated heavy rains over western Cuba throughout July 16–17, causing rivers to overflow their banks. An anemometer in Key West measured top winds of 52 mph (84 km/h) during the passage of the hurricane, with no damage to shipping in the harbor. A few schooners were forced to shelter in safe harbor overnight. Overall damage near the point of landfall in Florida was slight, as the area was thinly inhabited. Off the Atlantic coast of the Southeastern United States, the storm interrupted maritime traffic. Multiple ships in the path of the storm recorded hurricane-force winds; the lowest pressure reported dipped to 990 mbar (29.23 inHg).

=== Hurricane Five ===
- Category 4 hurricane (SSHWS)
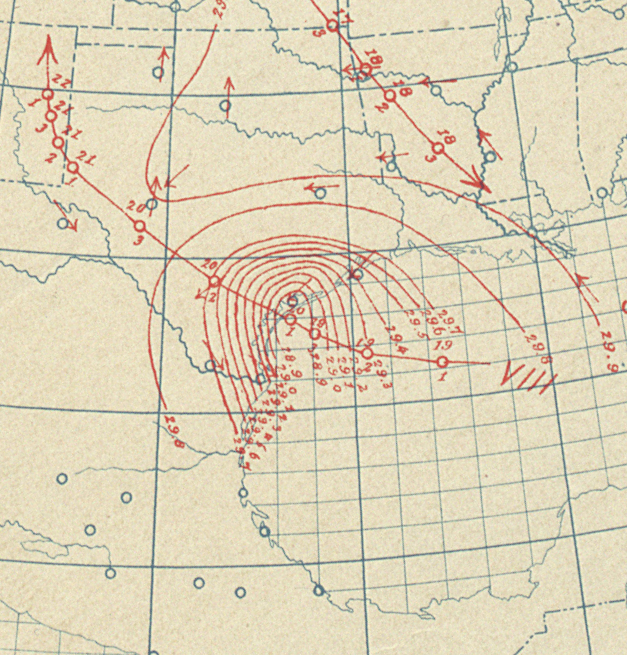
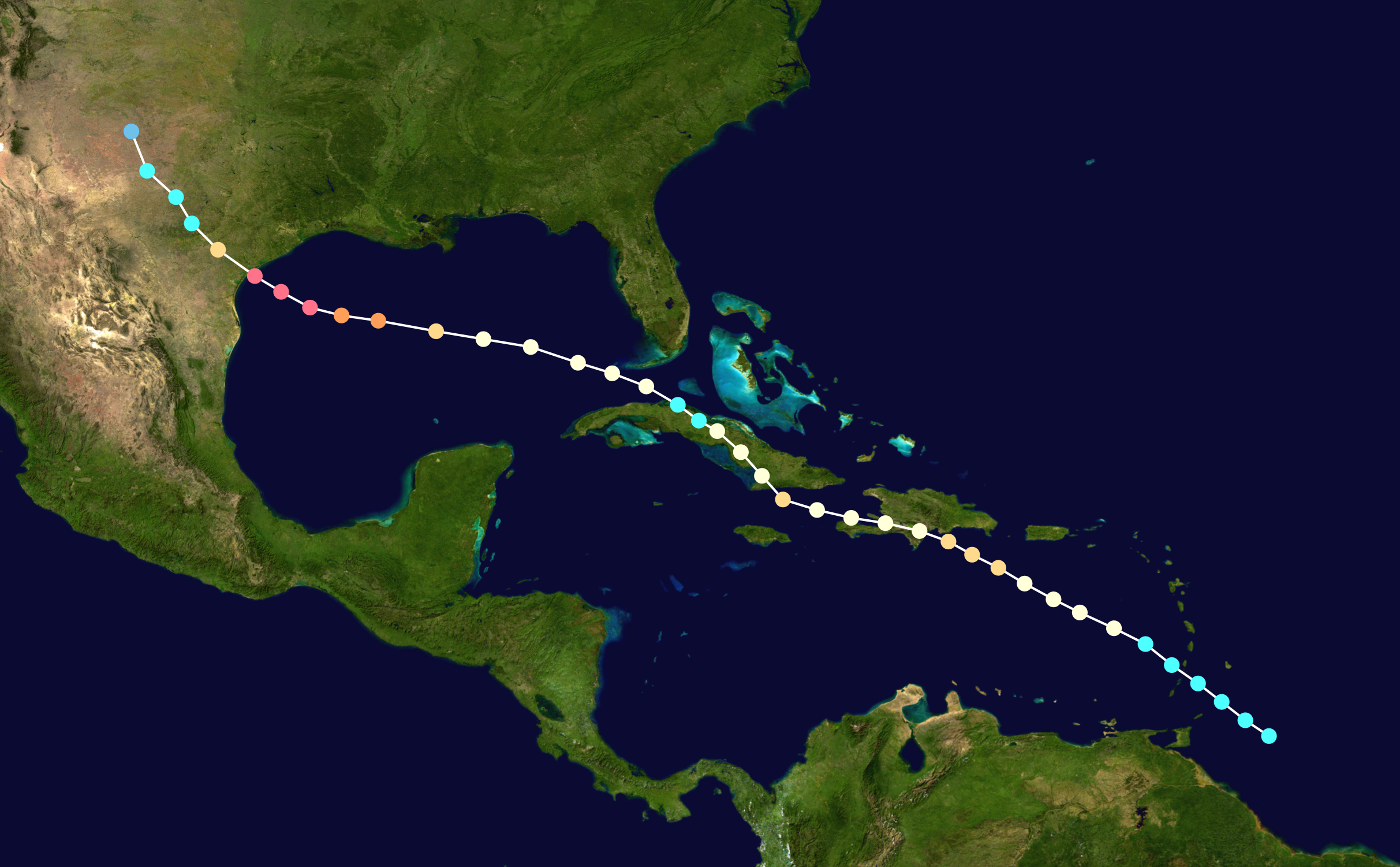
- Duration: August 12 – August 21
- Peak intensity: 150 mph (240 km/h) (1-min); 925 mbar (hPa)

HURDAT begins the track of this system as a tropical storm just east of Trinidad and Tobago on August 12, the day before the Windward Islands first observed stormy conditions. Early on August 13, the cyclone passed through the Grenadines and entered the eastern Caribbean, where it intensified into a hurricane several hours later. Further strengthening occurred as the storm moved northwestward, becoming a Category 2 hurricane prior to striking the Dominican Republic near Barahona on August 15. After crossing the south of Hispaniola as a Category 1 hurricane, it struck southeastern Cuba on August 16 as a Category 2 hurricane. The storm briefly weakened whilst over land and entered the Gulf of Mexico near Matanzas on August 18 as a Category 1 storm. As the hurricane crossed the Gulf of Mexico it strengthened further, becoming a 150 mph (240 km/h) Category 4 hurricane on August 20 while approaching Texas. Around 13:00 UTC, the hurricane struck southern Matagorda Island at that wind speed and with a barometric pressure of 925 mbar (27.3 inHg), both based on storm surge values and San Antonio observing a barometric pressure of 965 mbar (28.5 inHg). After making landfall, the storm weakened and dissipated late on August 21 near Lubbock.

Chenoweth's reanalysis proposed that this cyclone formed farther east of the Windward Islands and may not have made landfall in Cuba, instead moving very close to the island's north coast. Winds on Barbados uprooted trees. The island, as well as on Dominica and Guadeloupe, reported abnormally high tides on the coast. On Martinique, the storm severely damaged banana, breadfruit, and cassava crops. One sailor drowned on Guadeloupe after a ship capsized at the port in Saint-François. In Cuba, Havana recorded wind gusts ranging from about 56 to 67 mph (90 to 108 km/h) on August 18, toppling chimneys and trees. Sagua La Grande alone reported about $100,000 in damage. The hurricane caused 28 deaths in Cuba. Catastrophic impacts occurred across southern Texas. At Indianola, a storm surge of 15 ft (4.6 m) overwhelmed the town. Every building in the town was either demolished or left uninhabitable. When the hurricane blew down the Signal Office, a fire started which took hold and destroyed several neighboring blocks. The village of Quintana, at the mouth of the Brazos River was also destroyed. A bayou in Houston rose between 5 and 6 ft (1.5 and 1.8 m) on August 19. Bridges were overrun by flood water and trees blown over at Galveston, while several ships wrecked offshore there. Damage throughout Texas reached nearly $3 million (1886 USD) and at least 46 deaths occurred, all of the latter in Indianola.

=== Hurricane Six ===
- Category 3 hurricane (SSHWS)
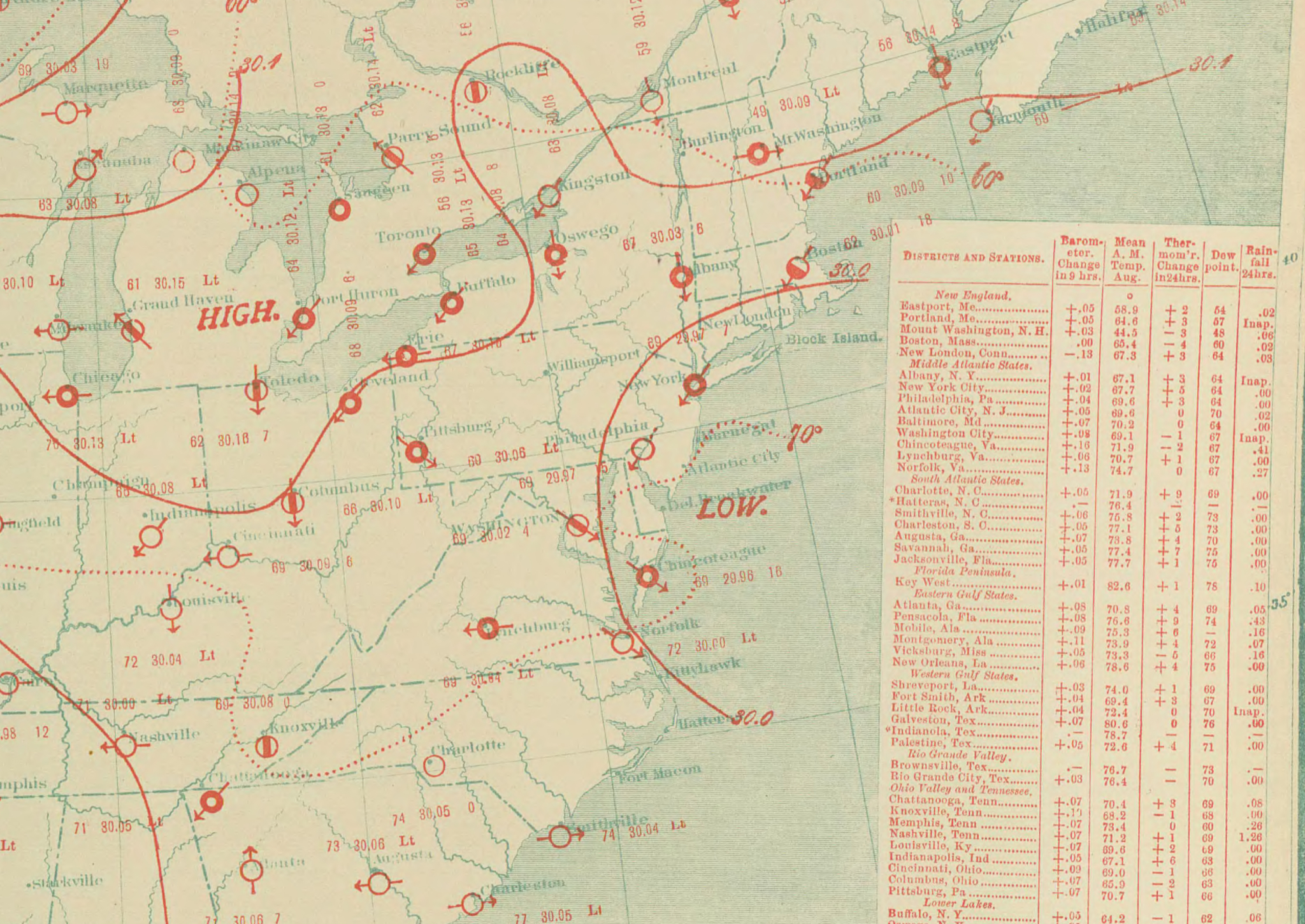
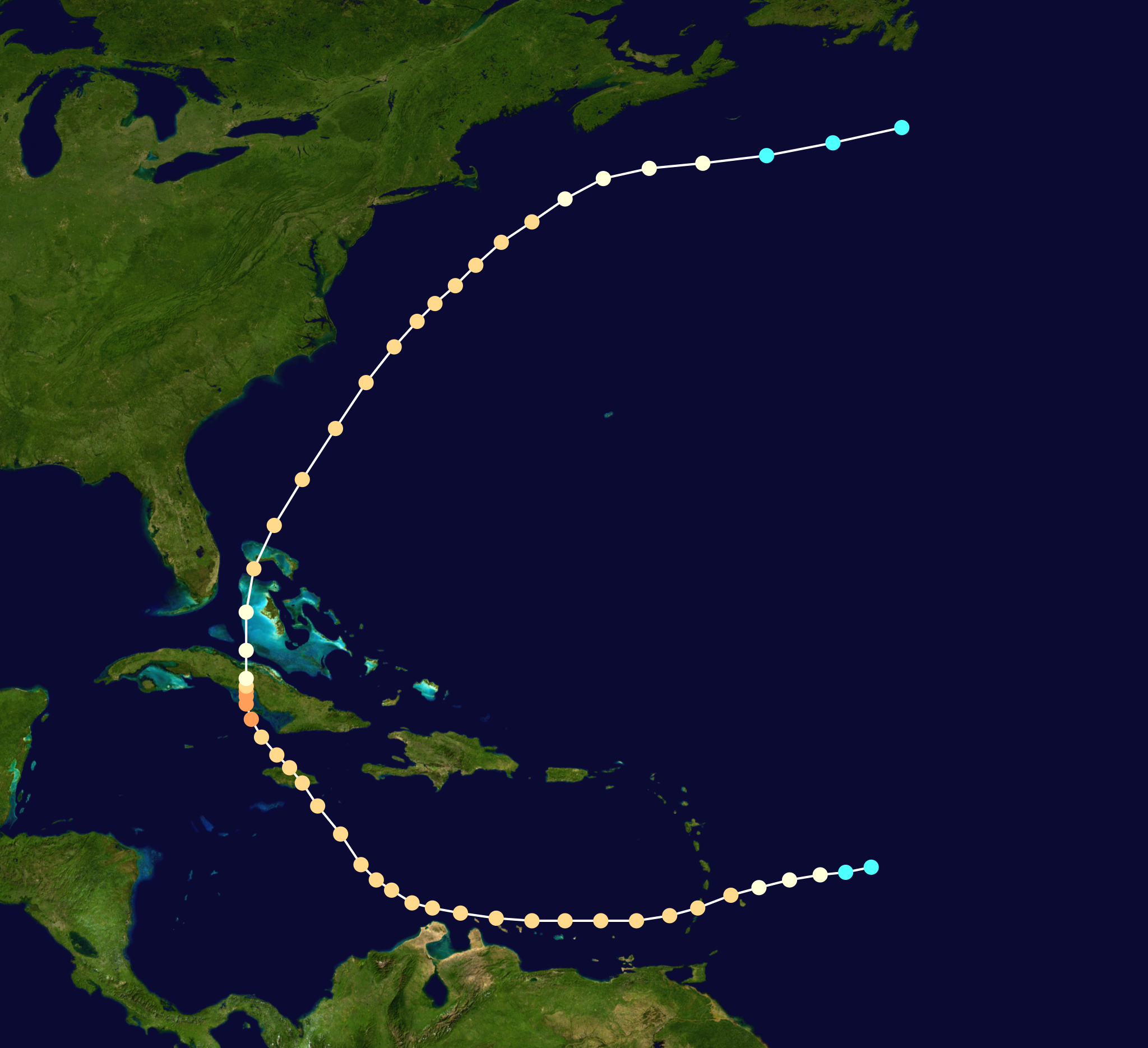
- Duration: August 15 – August 27
- Peak intensity: 120 mph (195 km/h) (1-min); ≤977 mbar (hPa)

The Cuba Hurricane of 1886
A steamer first encountered this cyclone about 90 mi (145 km) northeast of Barbados on August 15, leading the Atlantic hurricane reanalysis project to begin the track as a tropical storm about 340 mi (545 km) east-northeast of the island. Intensifying into a hurricane later that day, the storm passed over Saint Vincent and just north of Grenada as Category 2 hurricane on August 16 while moving west-southwestward. Entering the Caribbean, the hurricane turned westward and passed just north of the ABC islands on August 18, shortly before curving northwestward. The cyclone struck Jamaica early on August 20, also as a Category 2 hurricane. A ship known as Claribel recorded a barometric pressure of 977 mbar (28.9 inHg), the lowest in relation to the storm. Early on August 22, the system made landfall in Cuba west of Júcaro as a Category 3 hurricane with winds of 120 mph (195 km/h), based on a reanalysis by meteorologist Ramón Pérez Suárez. Turning northward, the cyclone weakened to a Category 1 hurricane before emerging into the Atlantic near Morón later that day. However, it re-intensified into a Category 2 just prior to curving northeastward and striking Grand Bahama early on August 23. Traveling parallel to the East Coast of the United States, the cyclone remained a Category 2 hurricane until August 26 and was last noted about 210 mi (340 km) south of Newfoundland on the following day as a tropical storm.

Chenoweth's 2014 reanalysis indicated that this storm developed late on August 12, but suggested few other changes. Barbados observed up to 7.26 in (184 mm) of precipitation. The cyclone uprooted trees and demolished some homes. Similarly, trees fell on Martinique, while the Macé River overflowed at Marigot. On Saint Vincent, the hurricane destroyed thousands of trees, three-hundred dwellings, and five churches. Some 1,500 people became destitute. At least five people were killed and approximately thirty others suffered injuries. Curaçao reported major damage. Extensive agricultural damage occurred in Jamaica, including reportedly the loss of all pimento and nearly all coffee crops. Accounts from the island also note widespread damage to homes, churches, schools, stores, wharves, and public property, while some ships wrecked in Kingston harbor. In Cuba, the storm destroyed hundreds of homes, uprooted many trees, flooded some areas, especially in Ciego de Ávila, Júcaro, Manzanillo, and Morón. Reports published in newspapers such as the Bath Daily Times also noted that "the banana trees suffered the most, and the loss to the poor people is very serious." In the Bahamas, several sailing ships were blown ashore, including at Nassau, Andros, and the Berry Islands. The Monthly Weather Review also noted "some loss of life" in the country.

=== Hurricane Seven ===
- Category 3 hurricane (SSHWS)
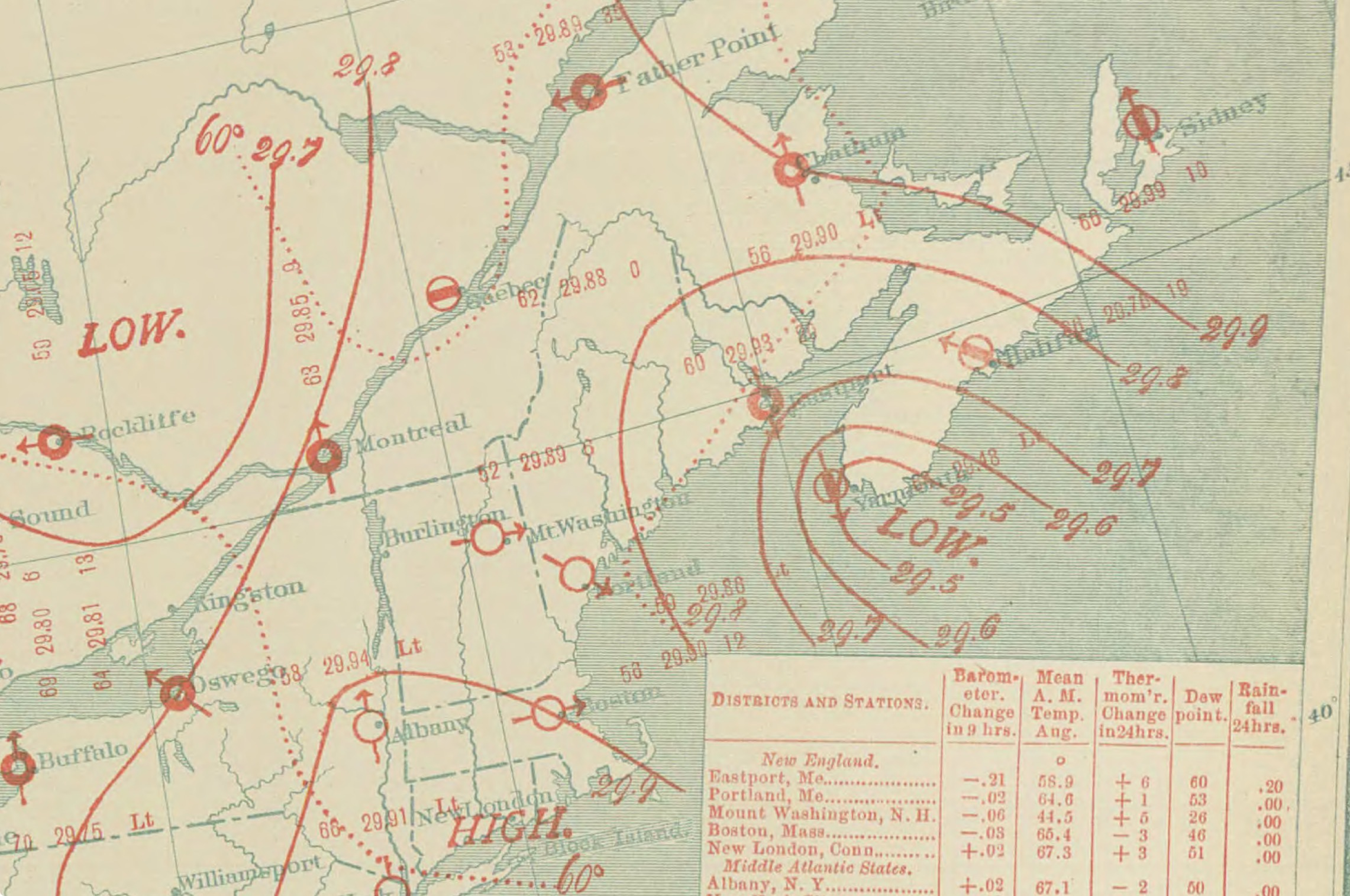
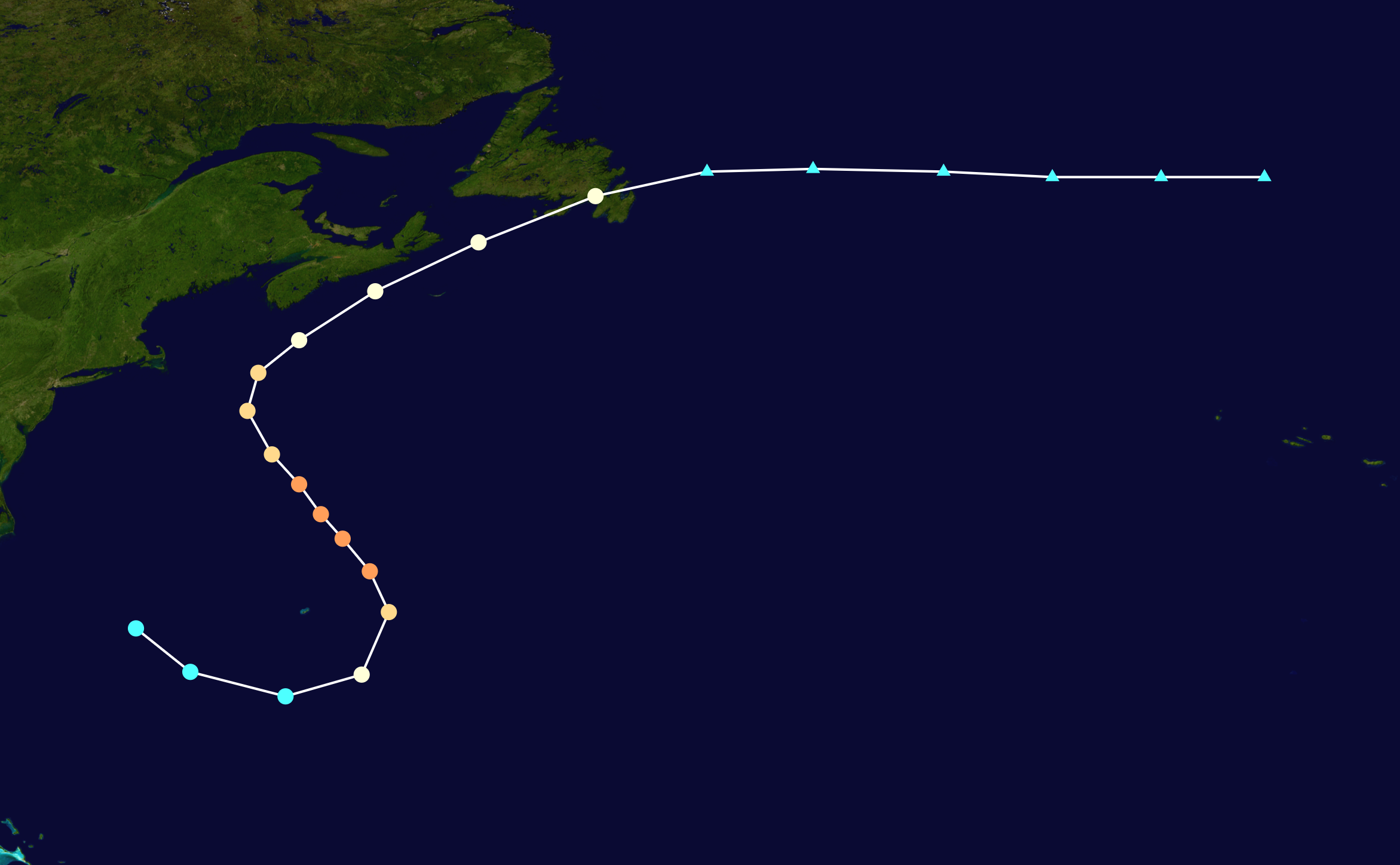
- Duration: August 20 – August 24
- Peak intensity: 115 mph (185 km/h) (1-min); ≤962 mbar (hPa)

The bark Argyll first detected this storm west of Bermuda on August 20, with the official track beginning about 360 mi (580 km) west-southwest of the island. The cyclone moved in a semicircle around the south side of Bermuda and intensified significantly during that time, becoming a hurricane around 06:00 UTC on August 20 and then a major hurricane just 12 hours later, based on the bark Edwin Reed recording a barometric pressure of 962 mbar (28.4 inHg). That day, the storm turned northwestward and headed away from Bermuda, before turning northeastward on August 23. Striking the Burin Peninsula of Newfoundland early the next day, the system transitioned into an extratropical cyclone just east of the island around 12:00 UTC. The extratropical remnants moved eastward and dissipated well north of the Azores on August 25.

The 2014 reanalysis study by Chenoweth postulated that this storm actually developed near the Cabo Verde Islands on August 13 and moved west-northwest to northwestward across the Atlantic. He also proposed that the system struck Nova Scotia on August 23 and turned east-northward, making landfall in Newfoundland on the next day. Despite the cyclone passing within 175 mi (280 km) of Bermuda, the island did not experience gale-force winds. Several vessels wrecked over the Grand Banks of Newfoundland, causing five deaths.

=== Hurricane Eight ===
- Category 2 hurricane (SSHWS)
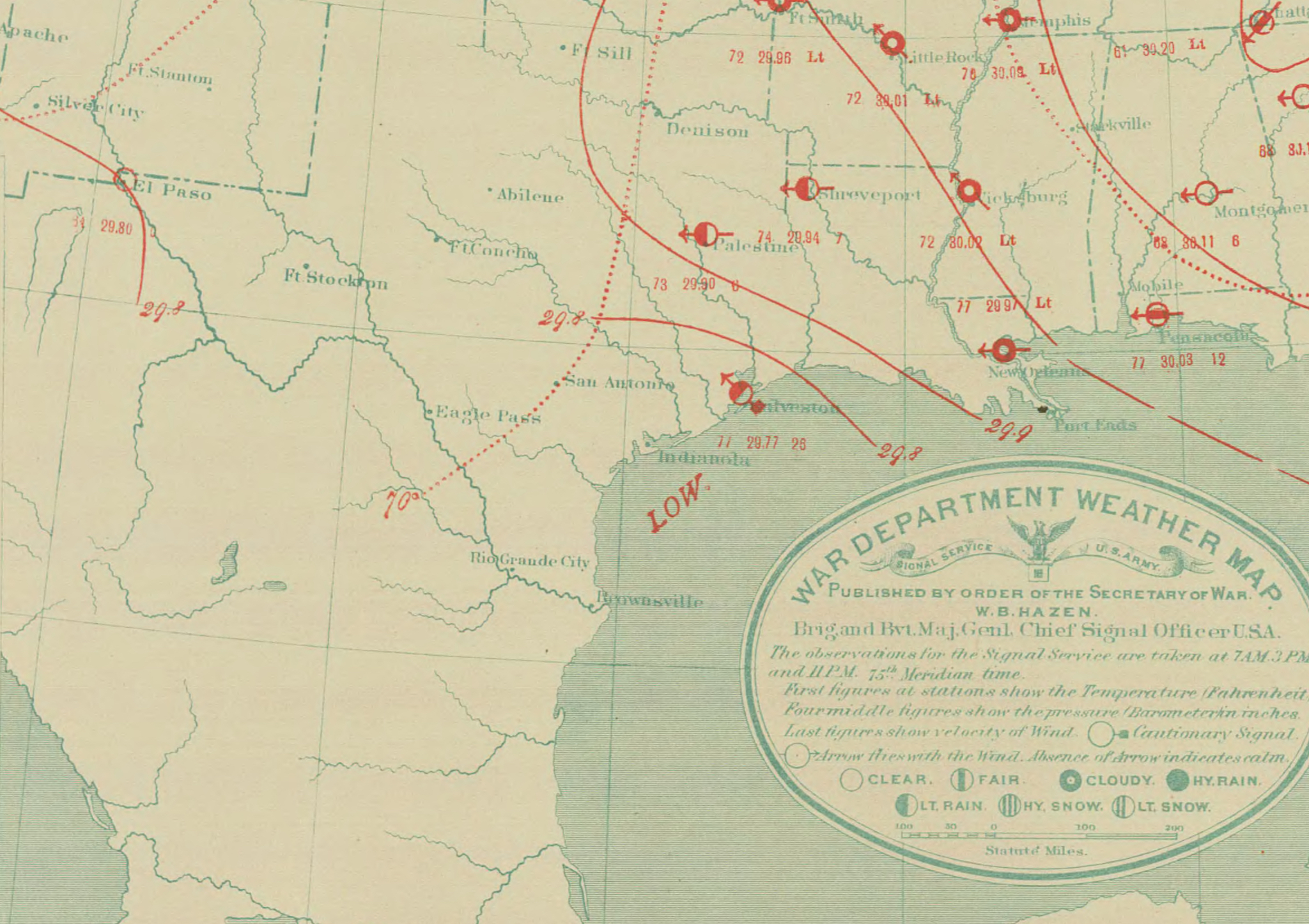
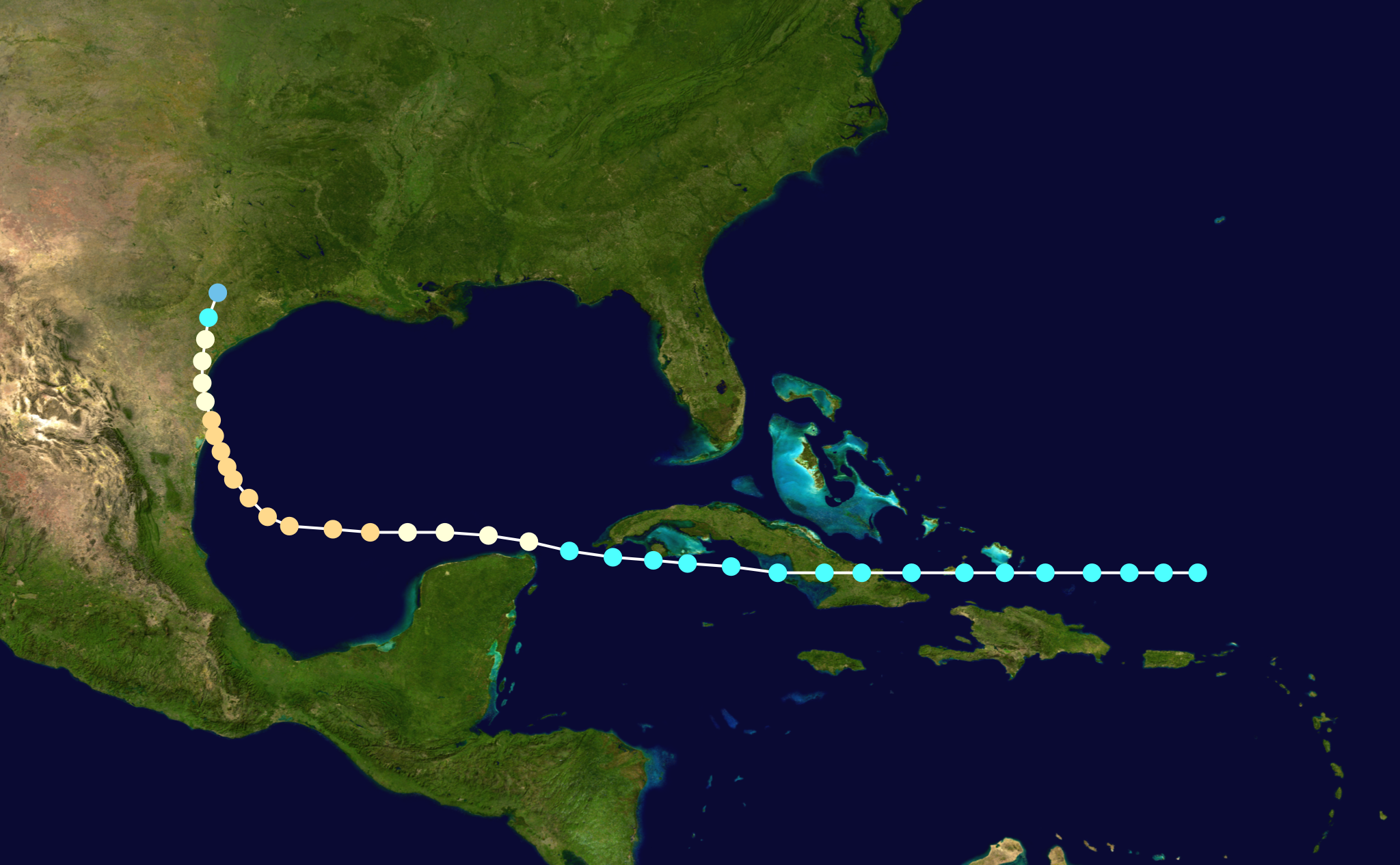
- Duration: September 16 – September 24
- Peak intensity: 100 mph (155 km/h) (1-min); 973 mbar (hPa)

The official track for this system begins as a tropical storm formed north of Puerto Rico on September 16, one day after the steamship Edith Godden reported stormy conditions. Traveling westward, the cyclone passed north of Hispaniola on September 17 and crossed Cuba over the present-day Las Tunas Province on September 18. The next day the storm passed just south of Isla de la Juventud and continued westward before curving north into the Gulf of Mexico. As the storm traveled north, parallel to the east coast of Mexico, it intensified to a 100 mph (155 km/h) Category 2 hurricane. The hurricane maintained this intensity until it made landfall just south of the Mexico–United States border early on September 23. After crossing into Texas, the system possessed a barometric pressure of 973 mbar (28.7 inHg), but quickly weakened and dissipated the next day to the southeast of Austin.

Chenoweth argued that this cyclone struck Cuba at a southwestward angle and quickly emerged into the Caribbean, remaining much farther away from the island thereafter. Maintaining a more southerly latitude, the cyclone also crossed the Yucatán Peninsula and later made landfall slightly farther south in Tamaulipas. Additionally, Chenoweth's study suggested that the system dissipated over east-central Missouri on September 25. The storm dropped heavy rainfall in Tamaulipas as it moved slowly just offshore and inland, leading to flooding. In Matamoros, the hurricane destroyed approximately 300 homes and inundated about 30 streets. Floods also impacted rural areas surrounding Matamoros and left railroads inaccessible in and around Matamoros and Monterrey. Roughly 500 families were rendered homeless as a result of the storm. Similarly, Texas also recorded heavy rainfall, including about 26 in (660 mm) at Brownsville between September 21 and September 23. Two hundred houses were blown down there. Only five weeks after the devastation brought by the fifth storm, Indianola was again flooded by rainwater and storm surge from Matagorda Bay. The remaining residents were evacuated. Following this storm the post office at Indianola was shut down, marking the official abandonment of the town.

=== Hurricane Nine ===
- Category 2 hurricane (SSHWS)
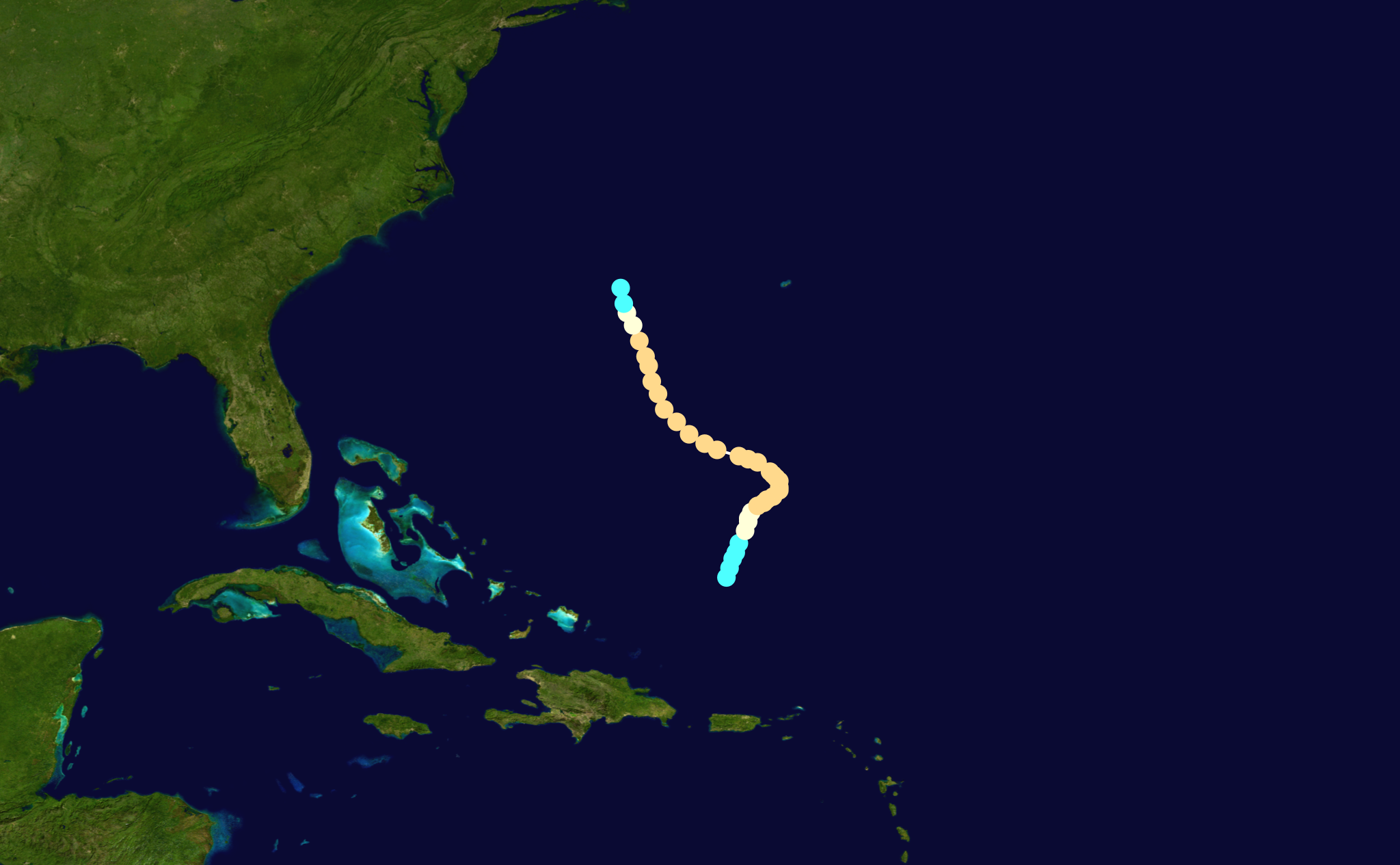
- Duration: September 22 – September 30
- Peak intensity: 100 mph (155 km/h) (1-min); ≤990 mbar (hPa)

On September 22, the bark Mary encountered this storm north of Puerto Rico. Early the next day, the tropical storm intensified into a hurricane as it headed northeastward and then into a Category 2 on September 24. The system peaked with winds of 100 mph (155 km/h), based on the Mary recording an atmospheric pressure of 990 mbar (29 inHg). On September 25, the brigantine Pearl recorded sightings of ball lighting and "St. Elmo's light at the yard-arms" September 25. The storm turned northwestward by September 26 and maintained this intensity until September 30, when it weakened to a Category 1 hurricane. Shortly thereafter, the system weakened to a tropical storm and was last noted about 305 mi (490 km) west of Bermuda. Chenoweth's reanalysis study argued that this cyclone instead developed just north of the Leeward Islands on September 20 and initially trekked northwestward until moving erratically for a few days. The storm headed in a more northerly direction from September 29 to October 1, at which time it accelerated northeastward, several hours before becoming extratropical.

=== Hurricane Ten ===
- Category 3 hurricane (SSHWS)
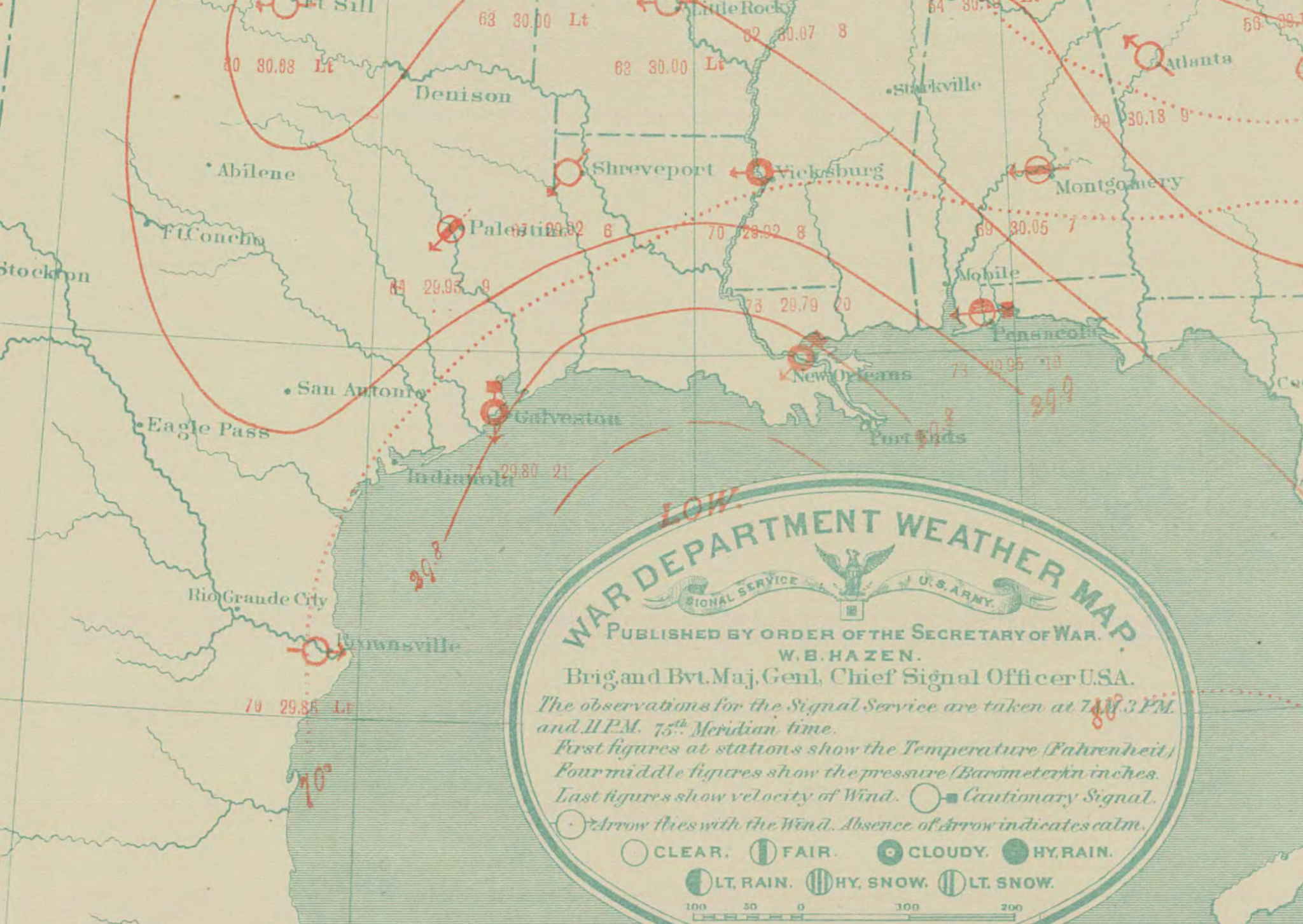
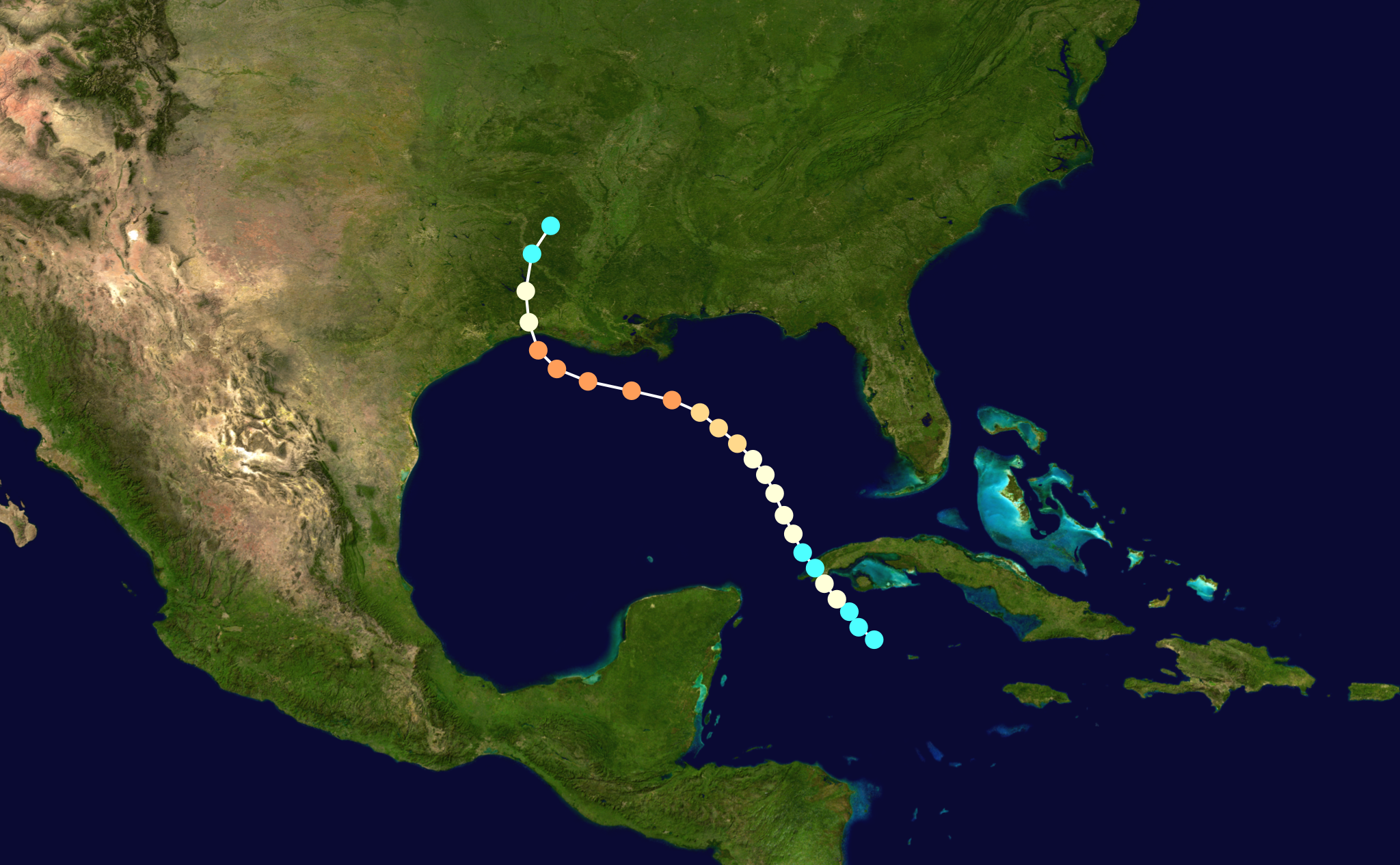
- Duration: October 8 – October 13
- Peak intensity: 120 mph (195 km/h) (1-min); 955 mbar (hPa)

The Texas–Louisiana Hurricane of 1886

A steamship known as Professor Morse encountered a tropical storm over the northwestern Caribbean on October 8. Early the next day, the storm struck the Guanahacabibes Peninsula of Cuba, likely as a Category 1 hurricane, based on the amount of damage in the area and reports from nearby ships. Weakening to a tropical storm, the cyclone re-intensified into a hurricane later on October 9. Turning west-northwest on October 11 over the northern Gulf of Mexico, the storm strengthened into a Category 3 hurricane with maximum sustained winds of 120 mph (195 km/h), based on tide measurements along the coast of Louisiana. Late on October 12, the hurricane made landfall near Cameron with an estimated barometric pressure of 955 mbar (28.2 inHg). The cyclone rapidly weakened, falling to Category 1 status early on October 13 and then a tropical storm several hours later. Around 18:00 UTC that day, the system dissipated over southern Arkansas.

Chenoweth proposed that this storm formed much farther south of October 4 and avoided landfall in Cuba. He also theorized that the extratropical remnants of this storm crossed the Midwestern United States and Ontario, leading to severe impacts along its path, particularly in Buffalo, New York, where "the full fury of the hurricane" destroyed twenty-nine homes and killed two people, according to the Kansas City Times. However, the Monthly Weather Review considered the extratropical system to have been an unrelated low-pressure area that developed a well-defined center over eastern Kansas on October 13. In Cuba, strong winds and heavy rains lashed Pinar del Río Province and Havana, albeit to a lesser extent in the latter. Parts of western Cuba suffered extensive damage, especially at Guane and Mantua, with the former being flooded by the overflowing Cuyaguateje River. The cyclone produced rain in Florida, with Sanford observing 4.24 in (108 mm) of precipitation. In eastern Louisiana, the hurricane inundated rice fields in Plaquemines Parish as far as 35 mi (55 km) inland, and destroyed most crops in Pointe à la Hache and Port Eads. Damage in that vicinity was estimated at $250,000 (1886 USD). Farther west, tides reached as high as 20 ft (6.1 m) above normal at Johnson Bayou, which also reported a 7 ft (2.1 m) storm surge that reached up to 20 mi (30 km) inland. Most buildings in the town were destroyed, and 110 residents drowned. Sabine Pass, Texas, was all but destroyed. Most buildings in the town were destroyed and 10 mi (15 km) of railroad track damaged. Numerous vessels were washed miles inshore and wrecked. At least 196 people died as a result of the storm.

=== Tropical Storm Eleven ===
- Tropical storm (SSHWS)
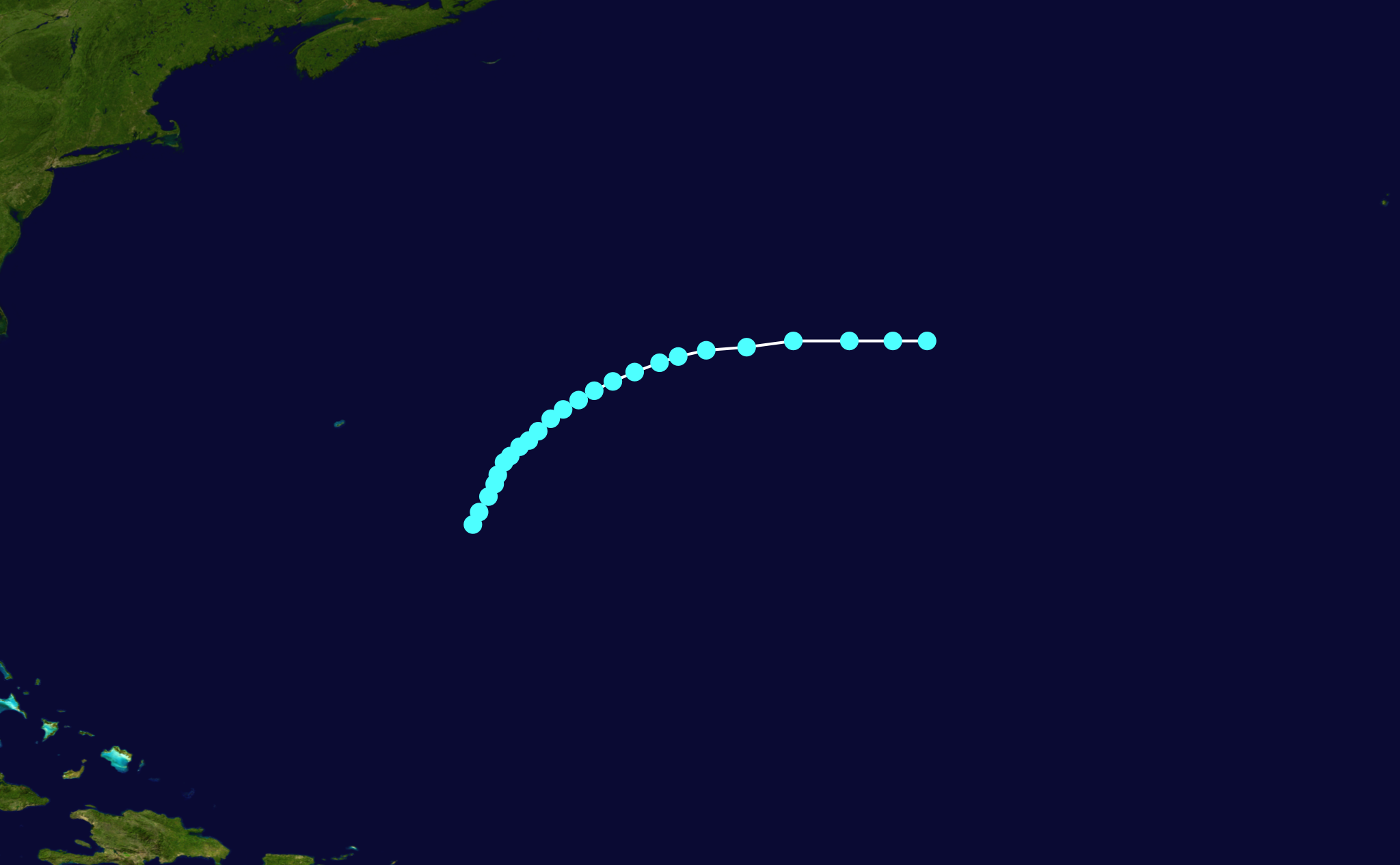
- Duration: October 10 – October 15
- Peak intensity: 50 mph (85 km/h) (1-min); 999 mbar (hPa)

Father Benito Viñes reported the first indications of the existence of this storm on October 10. Accordingly, the Atlantic hurricane database begins the track on that date about 340 mi (545 km) southeast of Bermuda. The storm drifted northeastward for the next few days and slowly intensified, peaking with maximum sustained winds of 50 mph (85 km/h), based a ship observing a barometric pressure of 999 mbar (29.5 inHg). Beginning an eastward turn on October 14, the storm was last noted about 1,000 mi (1,600 km) west-southwest of the Azores. Chenoweth proposed that this system formed northwest of Bermuda on October 6 as a subtropical storm. The cyclone transitioned into a tropical storm as it moved eastward, before beginning a generally southward motion by October 8. Three days later, the system reached hurricane status and then turned northeastward on October 12. The storm became extratropical on October 15 about midway between Bermuda and the Azores.

=== Tropical Storm Twelve ===
- Tropical storm (SSHWS)
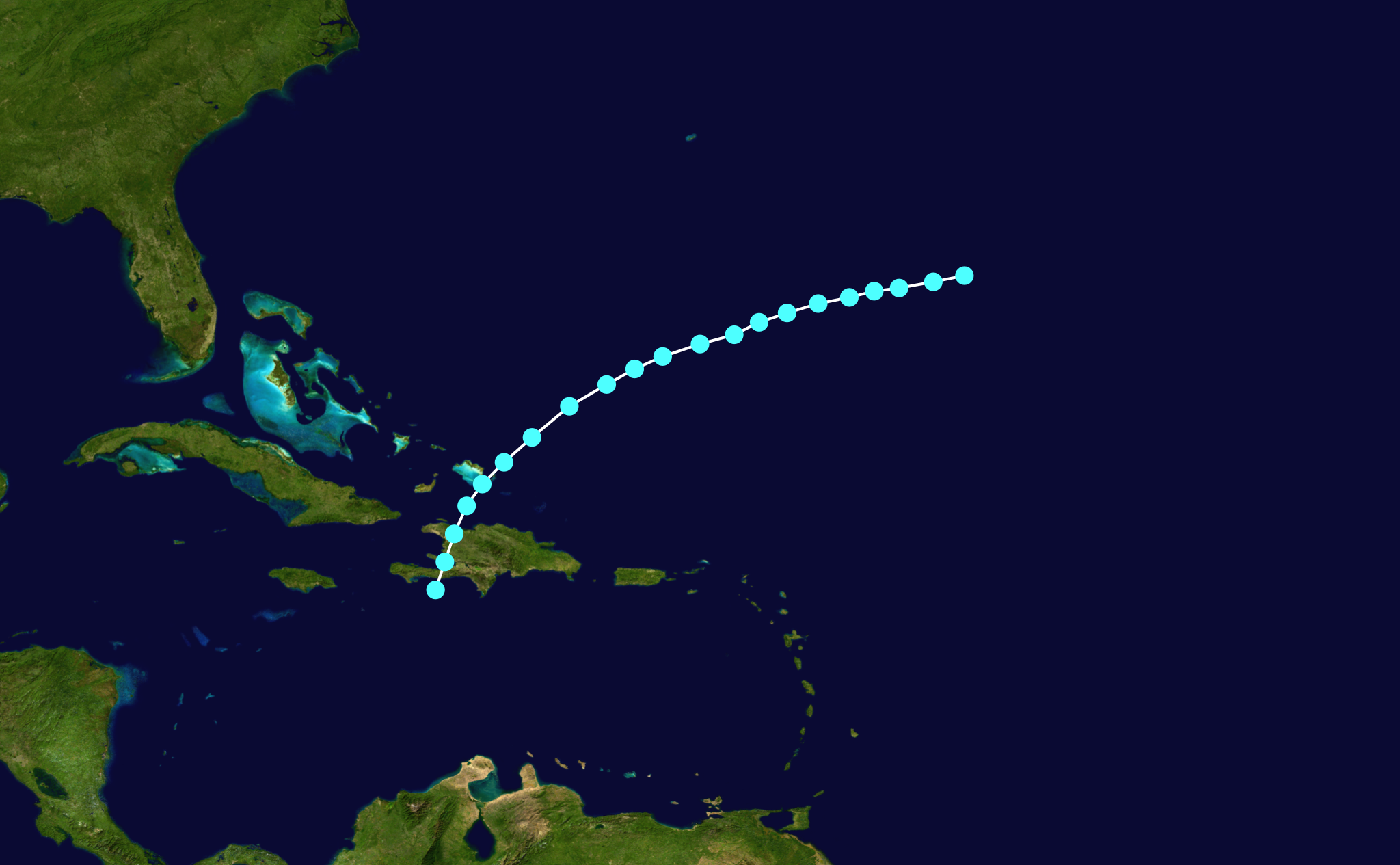
- Duration: October 21 – October 26
- Peak intensity: 70 mph (110 km/h) (1-min); ≤992 mbar (hPa)

Several ships reported a large, but weak, tropical storm in the Caribbean Sea, south of Haiti on October 22, although the official Atlantic hurricane database indicated that development occurred on the previous day. After crossing Haiti that day, the storm continued moving northeastward into the Atlantic. Based on the steamship L. & W. Armstrong recording a barometric pressure of 992 mbar (29.3 inHg), the cyclone nearly reached hurricane status, peaking with maximum sustained winds of 70 mph (110 km/h). The system gradually moved more west-northwestward later in its duration and was last noted about 600 mi (965 km) east-southeast of Bermuda. Chenoweth argued that this storm formed several hours earlier and moved on a mostly northeastward course, before being last detected on October 25. The study also suggested the cyclone maintained hurricane status on October 23 and October 24.

=== Other storm ===
Climate researcher Michael Chenoweth listed one other storm not currently listed in HURDAT. Developing near the Cabo Verde Islands on September 5, the tropical depression headed west-northwestward and intensified into a tropical storm on September 7, around which time it began moving northwestward. By September 9, the cyclone curved northeastward and east-northeastward on September 10. The system then dissipated on the following day well east of Bermuda.

== Season effects ==
This is a table of all of the known storms that have formed in the 1886 Atlantic hurricane season. It includes their duration, landfall, damages, and death totals. Deaths in parentheses are additional and indirect (an example of an indirect death would be a traffic accident), but were still related to that storm. Damage and deaths include totals while the storm was extratropical, a wave, or a low, and all of the damage figures are in 1886 USD.

1886 North Atlantic tropical cyclone season statistics
Storm name	Dates active	Storm category at peak intensity	Max 1-min wind mph (km/h)	Min. press. (mbar)	Areas affected	Damage (US$)	Deaths	Ref(s).
One	June 13–15	Category 2 hurricane	100 (155)	≤997	Gulf Coast of the United States (Texas)	Unknown	None	
Two	June 17–24	Category 2 hurricane	100 (155)	Unknown	Cuba, East Coast of the United States (Florida)	Unknown	Unknown	
Three	June 27 – July 2	Category 2 hurricane	100 (155)	<999	Jamaica, Cuba, East Coast of the United States (Florida)	Unknown	>21	
Four	July 14–22	Category 1 hurricane	85 (140)	≤990	Cuba, Southeastern United States (Florida)	Unknown	None	
Five	August 12–21	Category 4 hurricane	150 (240)	925	Lesser Antilles, Greater Antilles (the Dominican Republic, Cuba), Texas	>$3.1 million ($98 million in 2025)	75	
Six	August 15–27	Category 3 hurricane	120 (195)	≤977	Windward Islands (Saint Vincent), ABC islands, Greater Antilles (Jamaica, Cuba), the Bahamas	Unknown	>5	
Seven	August 20–24	Category 3 hurricane	115 (185)	≤962	Atlantic Canada (Newfoundland)	Unknown	5	
Eight	September 16–24	Category 2 hurricane	100 (155)	973	Cuba, Mexico (Tamaulipas), Texas	Unknown	None	
Nine	September 22–30	Category 2 hurricane	100 (155)	≤990	None	None	None	
Ten	October 8–13	Category 3 hurricane	120 (195)	955	Cuba, Gulf Coast of the United States (Louisiana)	>$250,000 ($7.9 million in 2025)	196	
Eleven	October 10–15	Tropical storm	50 (85)	999	None	None	None	
Twelve	October 21–26	Tropical storm	70 (110)	≤992	Hispaniola (Haiti), Turks and Caicos Islands	Unknown	None	
Season aggregates
12 systems	May 15 – October 26		150 (240)	925		>$3.35 million ($106 million in 2025)	>302	

== See also ==
- Atlantic hurricane season
- Tropical cyclone observation
- Atlantic hurricane reanalysis project
