= Cedartown, Maryland =

Unincorporated community in Maryland, United States

- Unincorporated community
- Location within Maryland
- Coordinates: 38°11′45″N 75°18′13″W
- Country: United States
- State: Maryland
- County: Worcester
- Elevation: 16 ft (4.9 m)
- Time zone: UTC-5 (Eastern (EST))
  - Summer (DST): UTC-4 (EDT)
- ZIP code: 21863
- Area codes: 410, 443, and 667
- GNIS feature ID: 589929

Cedartown is an unincorporated community in Worcester County, Maryland, United States. Cedartown is located at the intersection of Cedartown and Basket Switch roads, northeast of Snow Hill.
