= List of Category 2 Atlantic hurricanes =

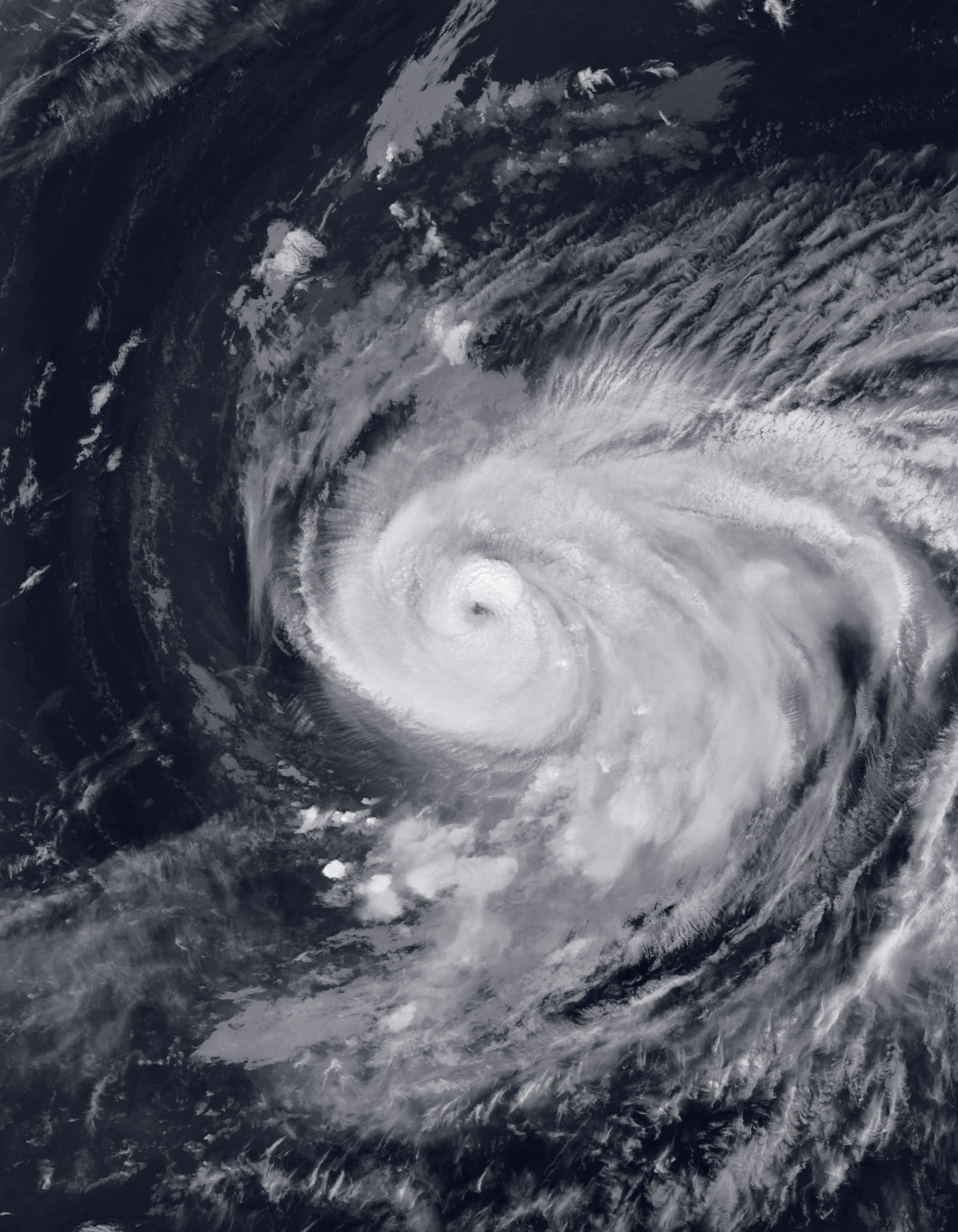
Hurricane Leslie at its peak intensity in the Atlantic Ocean on October 10, 2024. Leslie is currently the most recent Atlantic hurricane to peak as a Category 2.

Within the North Atlantic Ocean, a Category 2 hurricane is a tropical cyclone that has 1-minute sustained wind speeds of between 83–95 knots (96–109 mph; 154–176 km/h; 43–49 m/s). Since records began in 1851, a total of 246 tropical cyclones have peaked at this intensity.

== Background ==
Since HURDAT began in 1851, Atlantic hurricanes have been tracked. In 1971, the Saffir–Simpson scale was devised by two meteorologists. Category 2 was designed as the fourth-highest category on the scale.

== Systems ==
=== 1850s ===
Name	Duration	Peak intensity		Areas affected	Damage (USD)	Deaths	Refs
Name	Duration	Wind speed	Pressure	Areas affected	Damage (USD)	Deaths	Refs
Five	October 6 – 11, 1852	105 mph (165 km/h)	Not Specified	The Caribbean, Mexico, Southeastern United States	Extensive	Unknown	
Eight	October 19 – 22, 1853	105 mph (165 km/h)	Not Specified	Florida, Georgia	Significant	Unknown	
Four	September 16 – 20, 1854	105 mph (165 km/h)	Not Specified	Texas	$20,000	4	
One	August 6, 1855	105 mph (165 km/h)	Not Specified	Mexico	Unknown	Unknown	
Two	August 10 – 11, 1855	105 mph (165 km/h)	Not Specified	None	None	None	
Two	September 6 – 17, 1857	105 mph (165 km/h)	961 hPa (28.38 inHg)	United States East Coast	Unknown	>424	
Four	September 24 – 30, 1857	105 mph (165 km/h)	Not Specified	The Caribbean, Mexico, Texas	Unknown	Unknown	
Three	September 14 – 17, 1858	105 mph (165 km/h)	Not Specified	Florida, Northeastern United States	Minor	Unknown	
Six	October 21 – 26, 1858	105 mph (165 km/h)	Not Specified	Bahamas, Bermuda	Unknown	Unknown	
One	July 1, 1859	105 mph (165 km/h)	Not Specified	Mexico	Unknown	Unknown	
Two	August 17 – 19, 1859	105 mph (165 km/h)	Not Specified	None	None	None	

=== 1860s ===
Name	Dates	Peak intensity		Areas affected	Deaths	Damage (USD)	Refs
Name	Dates	Wind speed	Pressure	Areas affected	Deaths	Damage (USD)	Refs
Two	August 24 – 26, 1860	105 mph (165 km/h)	Not Specified	None	None	None	
Four	September 11 – 16, 1860	105 mph (165 km/h)	Not Specified	United States Gulf Coast	>$1 million	Unknown	
Six	September 30 – October 3, 1860	105 mph (165 km/h)	Not Specified	Louisiana, Mississippi	Severe	>13	
Seven	October 20 – 24, 1860	105 mph (165 km/h)	Not Specified	None	None	None	
One	July 6 – 12, 1861	105 mph (165 km/h)	Not Specified	Lesser Antilies	Unknown	Unknown	
Three	August 25 – 30, 1861	105 mph (165 km/h)	Not Specified	None	None	None	
Two	August 18 – 21, 1862	105 mph (165 km/h)	Not Specified	None	None	None	
Three	September 12 – 20, 1862	105 mph (165 km/h)	Not Specified	None	None	None	
One	August 8 – 9, 1863	105 mph (165 km/h)	Not Specified	None	None	None	
Two	August 18 – 19, 1863	105 mph (165 km/h)	Not Specified	None	None	None	
Three	August 19 – 23, 1863	105 mph (165 km/h)	975 hPa (28.79 inHg)	United States East Coast, Nova Scotia	Unknown	80	
Four	August 27 – 28, 1863	105 mph (165 km/h)	Not Specified	North Carolina	Unknown	Unknown	
Four	September 6 – 14, 1865	105 mph (165 km/h)	Not Specified	The Caribbean, United States Gulf Coast	Severe	>325	
Seven	October 18 – 25, 1865	105 mph (165 km/h)	Not Specified	The Caribbean, Florida	$300,000	1	
One	July 11 – 16, 1866	105 mph (165 km/h)	Not Specified	Louisiana, Texas	Unknown	Unknown	
Two	August 13 – 18, 1866	105 mph (165 km/h)	Not Specified	Mexico	Unknown	Unknown	
Four	September 22 – 24, 1866	105 mph (165 km/h)	Not Specified	Newfoundland	Unknown	8	
Two	July 28 – August 3, 1867	105 mph (165 km/h)	969 hPa (28.61 inHg)	United States East Coast	Unknown	2	
Three	August 2, 1867	105 mph (165 km/h)	Not Specified	The Caribbean	Unknown	Unknown	
Six	September 29 – October 1, 1867	105 mph (165 km/h)	Not Specified	None	None	None	
Seven	October 2 – 9, 1867	105 mph (165 km/h)	969 hPa (28.61 inHg)	Mexico, Texas, South Eastern United States	>$1 million	Many	
One	September 3 – 7, 1868	105 mph (165 km/h)	Not Specified	None	None	2	
Three	October 5 – 7, 1868	105 mph (165 km/h)	Not Specified	None	None	None	
Four	October 15 – 17, 1868	105 mph (165 km/h)	Not Specified	None	None	None	
One	August 12, 1869	105 mph (165 km/h)	Not Specified	None	None	None	
Two	August 16 – 17, 1869	105 mph (165 km/h)	Not Specified	Texas	Severe	Unknown	
Seven	September 11 – 18, 1869	105 mph (165 km/h)	979 hPa (28.91 inHg)	None	None	None	
Ten	October 4 – 5, 1869	105 mph (165 km/h)	Not Specified	Northeastern United States, New Brunswick	Severe	37	

=== 1870s ===
Name	Dates	Peak intensity		Areas affected	Deaths	Damage (USD)	Refs
Name	Dates	Wind speed	Pressure	Areas affected	Deaths	Damage (USD)	Refs
Two	August 30 – September 4, 1870	105 mph (165 km/h)	Not Specified	Nova Scotia	Unknown	Unknown	
Nine	October 19 – 22, 1870	105 mph (165 km/h)	Not Specified	Cuba, South Eastern United States	Severe	>52	
Ten	October 23, 1870	105 mph (165 km/h)	Not Specified	Hispanlola	Unknown	Unknown	
Five	August 30 – September 2, 1871	105 mph (165 km/h)	Not Specified	Atlantic Canada	Unknown	Unknown	
Two	August 20 – September 1, 1872	105 mph (165 km/h)	Not Specified	Atlantic Canada	Unknown	Unknown	
Seven	October 31 – November 4, 1874	105 mph (165 km/h)	Not Specified	Greater Antilles, Bahamas	Extensive	Unknown	
Five	October 7 – 10, 1875	105 mph (165 km/h)	Not Specified	None	None	None	
Four	September 29 – October 5, 1876	105 mph (165 km/h)	Not Specified	None	Unknown	Unknown	
Four	August 25 – 30, 1878	105 mph (165 km/h)	972 hPa (28.70 inHg)	The Bahamas	Unknown	Unknown	
Five	September 1 – 13, 1878	105 mph (165 km/h)	970 hPa (28.64 inHg)	The Caribbean, Eastern United States	Significant	9	
Six	September 12 – 18, 1878	105 mph (165 km/h)	Not Specified	None	None	None	
Eleven	October 18–21, 1878	105 mph (165 km/h)	963 hPa (28.44 inHg)	Cuba, Bahamas, United States East Coast	2 million	72	
Two	August 19–24, 1879	105 mph (165 km/h)	964 hPa (28.47 inHg)	Yucatán Peninsula, Texas, Louisiana	None	Unknown	
Eight	November 18 – 20, 1879	105 mph (165 km/h)	968 hPa (28.59 inHg)	Canada	Unknown	Unknown	

=== 1880s ===
Name	Dates	Peak intensity		Areas affected	Deaths	Damage (USD)	Refs
Name	Dates	Wind speed	Pressure	Areas affected	Deaths	Damage (USD)	Refs
Four	August 24 – September 1, 1880	105 mph (165 km/h)	972 hPa (28.70 inHg)	Florida, Mississippi	68	Unknown	
Five	August 21–29, 1881	105 mph (165 km/h)	970 hPa (28.64 inHg)	Georgia, Mississippi	700	Severe	
Six	September 7–11, 1881	105 mph (165 km/h)	975 hPa (28.79 inHg)	United States East Coast	0	Unknown	
Four	October 7–17, 1884	105 mph (165 km/h)	980 hPa (28.94 inHg)	Jamaica, Cuba, Bahamas, Turks and Caicos Islands	8	Unknown	
Two	August 21–27, 1885	105 mph (165 km/h)	953 hPa (28.14 inHg)	Bahamas, Florida, Georgia, South Carolina, North Carolina, Maryland	25	$1.8 million	
One	June 13–15, 1886	100 mph (155 km/h)	997 hPa (29.44 inHg)	Texas, Louisiana	Unknown	Unknown	
Two	June 17–24, 1886	100 mph (155 km/h)	Unknown	Florida, Southeastern United States, Mid-Atlantic states	0	Severe	
Three	June 27 – July 4, 1886	100 mph (155 km/h)	999 hPa (29.50 inHg)	Florida, North Carolina, Maryland	18	Unknown	
Eight	September 16–24, 1886	100 mph (155 km/h)	973 hPa (28.73 inHg)	Cuba, Texas	0	Unknown	
Nine	September 22–30, 1886	100 mph (155 km/h)	990 hPa (29.23 inHg)	None	None	None	
Four	July 20–28, 1887	100 mph (155 km/h)	981 hPa (28.97 inHg)	Cuba, Yucatán Peninsula, Florida, Georgia, Alabama	0	Extensive	
Eight	September 1 – 4, 1887	105 mph (165 km/h)	963 hPa (28.44 inHg)	United Kingdom	None	None	
Nine	September 11–22, 1887	100 mph (155 km/h)	973 hPa (28.73 inHg)	Yucatán Peninsula, Texas, Extreme Northeastern Mexico	14	Unknown	
Fifteen	October 15–19, 1887	105 mph (165 km/h)	975 hPa (28.79 inHg)	None	None	None	
Seven	October 8–12, 1888	110 mph (175 km/h)	970 hPa (28.64 inHg)	United States East Coast	0	Unknown	
Nine	November 17–25, 1888	100 mph (155 km/h)	982 hPa (29.00 inHg)	None	None	None	
Four	September 1–12, 1889	105 mph (165 km/h)	981 hPa (28.97 inHg)	Puerto Rico, Virginia	40	Minimal	
Six	September 12–25, 1889	110 mph (175 km/h)	985 hPa (29.09 inHg)	Yucatán Peninsula, Florida	0	Minor	

=== 1890s ===
Name	Dates	Peak intensity		Areas affected	Deaths	Damage (USD)	Refs
Name	Dates	Wind speed	Pressure	Areas affected	Deaths	Damage (USD)	Refs
Four	September 2–8, 1891	100 mph (155 km/h)	Unknown	New England, Nova Scotia, Newfoundland	0	Minor	
Five	September 16–26, 1891	100 mph (155 km/h)	980 hPa (28.94 inHg)	Bermuda	0	Minimal	
Six	September 29 – October 5, 1891	100 mph (155 km/h)	981 hPa (28.97 inHg)	Nova Scotia, Newfoundland	0	None	
Three	September 3–17, 1892	100 mph (155 km/h)	Unknown	None	0	None	
Five	September 12–23, 1892	100 mph (155 km/h)	Unknown	Azores	0	Minor	
Seven	October 5–16, 1892	100 mph (155 km/h)	Unknown	Trinidad and Tobago, Venezuela, Colombia, Nicaragua, Honduras, Mexico	0	Unknown	
Two	July 4–7, 1893	100 mph (155 km/h)	Unknown	Nicaragua, Belize, Yucatán Peninsula, Tabasco	Many	Unknown	
Five	August 15–19, 1893	100 mph (155 km/h)	Unknown	Sable Island, Newfoundland	0	Minor	
Seven	August 20–29, 1893	100 mph (155 km/h)	Unknown	Azores	5	Unknown	
Eight	September 4–9, 1893	100 mph (155 km/h)	973 hPa (28.73 inHg)	Yucatán Peninsula, Louisiana, Alabama	0	Unknown	
Seven	October 21–29, 1894		955 hPa (28.20 inHg)	None	0	None	
Two	August 22–30, 1895	110 mph (175 km/h)	963 hPa (28.44 inHg)	Yucatán Peninsula, Texas	0	Minimal	
Five	October 12–26, 1895	105 mph (165 km/h)	973 hPa (28.73 inHg)	Cuba, Bahamas	Unknown	Unknown	
One	July 4–9, 1896	100 mph (155 km/h)	Unknown	Cuba (questioned), United States East Coast, Canada, Greenland	1	$100 thousand	
Three	September 18–28, 1896	100 mph (155 km/h)	Unknown	Cuba, North Carolina	0	Minimal	
Five	October 7–13, 1896	100 mph (155 km/h)	Unknown	Florida, North Carolina, Virginia, New England	4	$500 thousand	
Six	October 26 – November 9, 1896	100 mph (155 km/h)	Unknown	None	0	None	
One	August 31 – September 9, 1897	100 mph (155 km/h)	972 hPa (28.70 inHg)	None	45	None	
Four	September 5–19, 1898	110 mph (175 km/h)	965 hPa (28.50 inHg)	Lesser Antilles, Windward Islands	383	$2.5 million	
Two	July 28 – August 2, 1899	100 mph (155 km/h)	979 hPa (28.91 inHg)	Dominican Republic, Bahamas, Florida, Alabama	7	>$1 million	
Four	August 29 – September 5, 1899	105 mph (165 km/h)	Unknown	Lesser Antilles, Puerto Rico, Haiti, Bermuda	0	Unknown	
Nine	October 26–31, 1899	110 mph (175 km/h)	955 hPa (28.20 inHg)	Cuba, Bahamas, Jamaica, North Carolina	1+	$200 thousand	.

=== 1900s ===
Name	Duration	Peak intensity		Areas affected	Damage (USD)	Deaths	Refs
Name	Duration	Wind speed	Pressure	Areas affected	Damage (USD)	Deaths	Refs
Three	September 8 – 23, 1900	100 mph (155 km/h)	Not Specified	None	None	None	
Seven	August 29 – September 10, 1901	105 mph (165 km/h)	Not Specified	Cape Verde	Unknown	Unknown	
Three	September 16 – 22, 1902	100 mph (155 km/h)	Not Specified	None	None	None	
Four	October 3 – 11, 1902	105 mph (165 km/h)	970 hPa (28.64 inHg)	Mexico, Southeastern United States	Unknown	Unknown	
Four	September 12 – 17, 1903	100 mph (155 km/h)	990 hPa (29.23 inHg)	United States East Coast	$9 million	57	
Six	September 26 – 30, 1903	110 mph (175 km/h)	988 hPa (29.18 inHg)	Bermuda	Severe	2	
Seven	October 1 – 9, 1903	100 mph (155 km/h)	Not Specified	None	None	None	
Two	June 14–23, 1906	105 mph (165 km/h)	979 hPa (28.91 inHg)	Cuba, Florida	0	Minor	
One	March 6–9, 1908	100 mph (155 km/h)	<984 hPa (29.06 inHg)	Leeward Islands	Unknown	1	
Eight	September 21 – October 7, 1908	110 mph (175 km/h)	971 hPa (28.67 inHg)	The Caribbean, The Bahamas	Unknown	Unknown	
Nine	October 14 – 19, 1908	105 mph (165 km/h)	Not Specified	Nicaragua	Unknown	2	
Two	June 25 – 30, 1909	100 mph (155 km/h)	972 hPa (28.70 inHg)	Texas, Mexico	$1.3 million	None	
Twelve	November 8 – 14, 1909	105 mph (165 km/h)	Unknown	Greater Antilles	$10 million	198	

=== 1910s ===
Name	Duration	Peak intensity		Areas affected	Damage (USD)	Deaths	Refs
Name	Duration	Wind speed	Pressure	Areas affected	Damage (USD)	Deaths	Refs
Three	September 5 – 15, 1910	110 mph (175 km/h)	Not Specified	Puerto Rico, Texas, Louisiana	Unknown	Unknown	
Four	September 24 – 27, 1910	100 mph (155 km/h)	Not Specified	None	None	None	
Three	August 23 – 30, 1911	100 mph (155 km/h)	972 hPa (28.70 inHg)	Georgia, South Carolina	$27.4 million	17	
Four	September 3 – 12, 1911	100 mph (155 km/h)	Not Specified	Colombia, Nicaragua	$2 million	10	
Six	October 11 – 18, 1912	100 mph (155 km/h)	Not Specified	Yucatán Peninsula, Texas	$28,000	42	
Four	August 31 – September 6, 1915	100 mph (155 km/h)	982 hPa (29.00 inHg)	Cuba, Eastern United States	>$100,000	25	
Three	July 10 – 22, 1916	105 mph (165 km/h)	980 hPa (28.94 inHg)	Massachusetts, Nova Scotia	Unknown	Unknown	
Seven	August 21 – 26, 1916	110 mph (175 km/h)	Not Specified	Greater Antiles, Florida	$1 million	1	
Fourteen	October 9 – 19, 1916	110 mph (175 km/h)	970 hPa (28.64 inHg)	Yucatán Peninsula, Florida, Alabama	$100,000	69	
Two	August 22 – 26, 1918	105 mph (165 km/h)	968 hPa (28.59 inHg)	Honduras, Belize	Minor	None	
Five	September 2 – 6, 1918	110 mph (175 km/h)	Not Specified	Bermuda	Minor	21	
Three	September 2 – 5, 1919	100 mph (155 km/h)	Not Specified	None	None	None	
One	September 7 – 14, 1920	110 mph (175 km/h)	Not Specified	None	None	None	
Two	September 16 – 23, 1920	100 mph (155 km/h)	975 hPa (28.79 inHg)	Central America, Louisiana, Arkansas	$1.45 million	1	

=== 1920s ===
Name	Dates	Peak intensity		Areas affected	Deaths	Damage (USD)	Refs
Name	Dates	Wind speed	Pressure	Areas affected	Deaths	Damage (USD)	Refs
Four	October 11–22, 1922	110 mph (175 km/h)	984 hPa (29.06 inHg)	Colombia, Yucatán Peninsula, Tabasco	0	Unknown	
Two	September 1–9, 1923	105 mph (165 km/h)	989 hPa (29.21 inHg)	None	0	None	
Four	August 26 – September 3, 1924	110 mph (175 km/h)	965 hPa (28.50 inHg)	Guadeloupe, Montserrat, Anguilla, Saint Thomas, Leeward Islands	89	Heavy	
Five	September 10–14, 1926	105 mph (165 km/h)	1000 hPa (29.53 inHg)	None	0	None	
Eight	September 21 – October 1, 1926	105 mph (165 km/h)	978 hPa (28.88 inHg)	Azores	0	Minor	
Four	September 23–28, 1927	110 mph (175 km/h)	967 hPa (28.56 inHg)	None	0	None	
One	August 3–10, 1928	105 mph (165 km/h)	971 hPa (28.67 inHg)	Bahamas, Florida, Georgia, South Carolina	2	$235 thousand	

=== 1930s ===
Name	Dates	Peak intensity		Areas affected	Deaths	Damage (USD)	Refs
Name	Dates	Wind speed	Pressure	Areas affected	Deaths	Damage (USD)	Refs
Seven	September 8–16, 1931	100 mph (155 km/h)	987 hPa (29.15 inHg)	Puerto Rico, Dominican Republic, Haiti, Jamaica, Belize, Yucatán Peninsula, Veracruz	2	Moderate	
Fifteen	November 3–10, 1932	100 mph (155 km/h)	973 hPa (28.73 inHg)	Azores	0	Unknown	
Two	June 24 – July 8, 1933	110 mph (175 km/h)	965 hPa (28.50 inHg)	Trinidad, Venezuela, Jamaica, Cayman Islands, Cuba, Tamaulipas	35	$7.5 million	
Thirteen	September 10–15, 1933	110 mph (175 km/h)	960 hPa (28.35 inHg)	Guatemala, Belize, Quintana Roo, Yucatán Peninsula, Tampico	67	Millions	
One	June 4–18, 1934	100 mph (155 km/h)	966 hPa (28.53 inHg)	Belize, Guatemala, Chiapas, Yucatán Peninsula, Louisiana, Mississippi, Tennessee	>1,000	$4.4 million	.
Seven	September 3–7, 1934	105 mph (165 km/h)	967 hPa (28.56 inHg)	United States East Coast	8	$10 thousand	
Ten	October 1–4, 1934	100 mph (155 km/h)	984 hPa (29.06 inHg)	None	0	None	
Seven	October 30 – November 8, 1935	105 mph (165 km/h)	964 hPa (28.47 inHg)	The Bahamas, Florida	19	$5.5 million	
Five	July 27 – August 1, 1936	105 mph (165 km/h)	964 hPa (28.47 inHg)	Bahamas, Florida, Alabama	4	$200 thousand	
Ten	August 25 – September 5, 1936	110 mph (175 km/h)	959 hPa (28.32 inHg)	None	0	None	
Fifteen	September 18–25, 1936	105 mph (165 km/h)	977 hPa (28.85 inHg)	Nova Scotia	0	None	
Four	September 9–14, 1937	100 mph (155 km/h)	992 hPa (29.29 inHg)	Nova Scotia, Canada	0	$1.5 million	
Eight	September 20–26, 1937	100 mph (155 km/h)	982 hPa (29.00 inHg)	None	0	None	

=== 1940s ===
Name	Dates	Peak intensity		Areas affected	Deaths	Damage (USD)	Refs
Name	Dates	Wind speed	Pressure	Areas affected	Deaths	Damage (USD)	Refs
Two	August 3–10, 1940	100 mph (155 km/h)	972 hPa (28.70 inHg)	Texas, Louisiana, Arkansas	7	$10.75 million	
Three	August 5–14, 1940	100 mph (155 km/h)	972 hPa (28.70 inHg)	South Carolina, Mid-Atlantic states	52	$13 million	
Four	August 26 – September 2, 1940	110 mph (175 km/h)	961 hPa (28.38 inHg)	North Carolina, New England, Nova Scotia, Quebec	7	$4.05 million	
Five	September 7–17, 1940	100 mph (155 km/h)	988 hPa (29.18 inHg)	Nova Scotia, Newfoundland	3	$1.49 million	
Seven	September 22–28, 1940	100 mph (155 km/h)	977 hPa (28.85 inHg)	Azores	0	None	
Four	August 25 – September 3, 1942	110 mph (175 km/h)	Unknown	None	0	None	
Eleven	November 5–11, 1942	110 mph (175 km/h)	992 hPa (29.29 inHg)	Cuba, Belize, Mexico	9	$9 million	
One	July 25–30, 1943	105 mph (165 km/h)	967 hPa (28.56 inHg)	Texas, Louisiana	19	$17 million	
Six	September 15–20, 1943	100 mph (155 km/h)	Unknown	United States Gulf Coast	0	$419 thousand	
Nine	October 11–17, 1943	110 mph (175 km/h)	Unknown	Leeward Islands, Puerto Rico, Bermuda	0	$300 thousand	
Nine	September 21–26, 1944	100 mph (155 km/h)	Unknown	None	0	None	
One	June 20–27, 1945	100 mph (155 km/h)	985 hPa (29.09 inHg)	United States East Coast	1	$750 thousand	
Eleven	October 10–13, 1945	100 mph (155 km/h)	982 hPa (29.00 inHg)	Greater Antilles, Bahamas	5	$2 million	
Four	September 12–15, 1946	100 mph (155 km/h)	975 hPa (28.79 inHg)	Bahamas, Nova Scotia, Newfoundland	0	None	
Six	October 5–9, 1946	100 mph (155 km/h)	977 hPa (28.85 inHg)	Cuba, Florida, Georgia, South Carolina	5	$5.2 million	
Charlie	August 9–16, 1947	110 mph (175 km/h)	977 hPa (28.85 inHg)	Quintana Roo, Tamaulipas	48	Unknown	
King	October 8–16, 1947	105 mph (165 km/h)	965 hPa (28.50 inHg)	Honduras, Florida, Alabama	1	$3.26 million	
One	August 21–25, 1949	110 mph (175 km/h)	974 hPa (28.76 inHg)	North Carolina	2	$50 thousand	
Eleven	September 27 – October 6, 1949	110 mph (175 km/h)	965 hPa (28.50 inHg)	Guatemala, Campeche, Texas	2	$6.7 million	

=== 1950s ===
Name	Dates	Peak intensity		Areas affected	Deaths	Damage (USD)	Refs
Name	Dates	Wind speed	Pressure	Areas affected	Deaths	Damage (USD)	Refs
Baker	August 18 – September 1, 1950	105 mph (165 km/h)	978 hPa (28.88 inHg)	Leeward Islands, Puerto Rico, Hispaniola, Cuba, United States Gulf Coast	38	$2.5 million	
Charlie	August 21 – September 5, 1950	110 mph (175 km/h)	974 hPa (28.76 inHg)	None	0	None	
George	September 27 – October 5, 1950	110 mph (175 km/h)	960 hPa (28.35 inHg)	Iceland	0	None	
Item	October 8–11, 1950	105 mph (165 km/h)	976 hPa (28.82 inHg)	Yucatán Peninsula, Western Mexico	0	$1.5 million	
How	September 29 – October 5, 1951	100 mph (155 km/h)	972 hPa (28.70 inHg)	Florida, Iceland	17	$2 million	
Able	August 18 – September 3, 1952	100 mph (155 km/h)	980 hPa (28.94 inHg)	South Carolina, North Carolina, Virginia, Maryland	3	$21.7 million	
Baker	August 31 – September 8, 1952	110 mph (175 km/h)	969 hPa (28.61 inHg)	None	0	None	
Easy	October 6–11, 1952	105 mph (165 km/h)	968 hPa (28.59 inHg)	None	0	None	
Alice	June 24–27, 1954	110 mph (175 km/h)	975 hPa (28.79 inHg)	Mexico	56	$2 million	
Thirteen	September 25 – October 6, 1954	100 mph (155 km/h)	964 hPa (28.47 inHg)	None	0	None	
Diane	August 7–20, 1955	105 mph (165 km/h)	969 hPa (28.61 inHg)	North Carolina, Pennsylvania, New York, New Jersey, New England	184	$754.7 million	
Edith	August 21–31, 1955	105 mph (165 km/h)	967 hPa (28.56 inHg)	None	0	None	
Flora	September 2–9, 1955	105 mph (165 km/h)	967 hPa (28.56 inHg)	None	0	None	
Katie	October 14–19, 1955	110 mph (175 km/h)	984 hPa (29.06 inHg)	Central America, Dominican Republic, Hispaniola, Puerto Rico, Cuba, Bahamas, Dominica	7	$200 thousand	
Greta	October 31 – November 6, 1956	100 mph (155 km/h)	970 hPa (28.64 inHg)	Cuba, Bahamas, Florida, Guadeloupe	1	$3.58 million	
Ella	August 30 – September 6, 1958	110 mph (175 km/h)	983 hPa (29.03 inHg)	Haiti, Dominican Republic, Cuba, Louisiana, Texas	37	>$100 thousand	
Ilsa	September 24–30, 1958	110 mph (175 km/h)	956 hPa (28.23 inHg)	Bermuda	0	None	
Janice	October 4–11, 1958	100 mph (155 km/h)	968 hPa (28.59 inHg)	Jamaica, Cuba, Bahamas	9	$200 thousand	

=== 1960s ===
Name	Dates	Peak intensity		Areas affected	Deaths	Damage (USD)	Refs
Name	Dates	Wind speed	Pressure	Areas affected	Deaths	Damage (USD)	Refs
Anna	July 20–24, 1961	105 mph (165 km/h)	976 hPa (28.82 inHg)	Windward Islands, Colombia, Venezuela, Central America, Jamaica	1	$300 thousand	
Daisy	September 29 – October 7, 1962	105 mph (165 km/h)	963 hPa (28.44 inHg)	Leeward Islands, Bermuda, New England, Atlantic Canada	32	$1.1 million	
Ella	October 14–22, 1962	110 mph (175 km/h)	958 hPa (28.29 inHg)	Cuba, United States East Coast, Atlantic Canada	2	Unknown	
Edith	September 23–29, 1963	100 mph (155 km/h)	990 hPa (29.23 inHg)	Lesser Antilles, Puerto Rico, Hispaniola, Turks and Caicos Islands, Bahamas	10	$46.6 million	
Ginny	October 17–29, 1963	110 mph (175 km/h)	948 hPa (27.99 inHg)	Hispaniola, Turks and Caicos Islands, The Bahamas, United States East Coast, Nova Scotia, Newfoundland	5	$500 thousand	
Ethel	September 4–14, 1964	105 mph (165 km/h)	974 hPa (28.76 inHg)	Bermuda	0	Minimal	
Anna	August 21–25, 1965	105 mph (165 km/h)	976 hPa (28.82 inHg)	None	0	None	
Elena	October 12–19, 1965	110 mph (175 km/h)	977 hPa (28.85 inHg)	None	0	None	
Chloe	September 5–21, 1967	110 mph (175 km/h)	958 hPa (28.29 inHg)	Cape Verde, Spain, France	14	Unknown	
Kara	October 7–18, 1969	105 mph (165 km/h)	978 hPa (28.88 inHg)	North Carolina	0	None	
Laurie	October 17–27, 1969	105 mph (165 km/h)	973 hPa (28.73 inHg)	Mexico	0	Minor	

=== 1970s ===
Name	Dates	Peak intensity		Areas affected	Deaths	Damage (USD)	Refs
Name	Dates	Wind speed	Pressure	Areas affected	Deaths	Damage (USD)	Refs
Eighteen	October 12–17, 1970	105 mph (165 km/h)	974 hPa (28.76 inHg)	Bermuda, Nova Scotia, Newfoundland	0	Unknown	
Ginger	September 6 – October 3, 1971	110 mph (175 km/h)	959 hPa (28.32 inHg)	Bahamas, North Carolina	1	$10 million	
Betty	August 22 – September 1, 1972	105 mph (165 km/h)	976 hPa (28.82 inHg)	None	0	None	
Fifi	September 14–22, 1974	110 mph (175 km/h)	971 hPa (28.67 inHg)	Hispaniola, Jamaica, Mexico, Central America	8,210	$1.8 billion	
Doris	August 28 – September 4, 1975	110 mph (175 km/h)	965 hPa (28.50 inHg)	None	0	None	
Faye	September 18–29, 1975	105 mph (165 km/h)	977 hPa (28.85 inHg)	Bermuda	0	Minimal	
Emmy	August 20 – September 4, 1976	105 mph (165 km/h)	974 hPa (28.76 inHg)	Lesser Antilles, Azores	68	Minimal	
Gloria	September 26 – October 4, 1976	105 mph (165 km/h)	970 hPa (28.64 inHg)	None	0	None	
Flossie	September 4–15, 1978	100 mph (155 km/h)	976 hPa (28.82 inHg)	None	0	None	
Gloria	September 4–15, 1979	100 mph (155 km/h)	975 hPa (28.79 inHg)	None	0	None	

=== 1980s ===
Name	Dates	Peak intensity		Areas affected	Deaths	Damage (USD)	Refs
Name	Dates	Wind speed	Pressure	Areas affected	Deaths	Damage (USD)	Refs
Bonnie	August 14–19, 1980	100 mph (155 km/h)	975 hPa (28.79 inHg)	None	0	None	
Ivan	October 4–11, 1980	105 mph (165 km/h)	970 hPa (28.64 inHg)	None	0	None	
Jeanne	November 8–16, 1980	100 mph (155 km/h)	986 hPa (29.12 inHg)	Florida, Gulf of Mexico, United States Gulf Coast	0	Minimal	
Gert	September 7–15, 1981	105 mph (165 km/h)	988 hPa (29.18 inHg)	Puerto Rico	0	None	
Josephine	October 7–18, 1984	105 mph (165 km/h)	965 hPa (28.50 inHg)	United States East Coast	1	Minor	
Earl	September 10–18, 1986	105 mph (165 km/h)	979 hPa (28.91 inHg)	None	0	None	
Dean	July 31 – August 9, 1989	105 mph (165 km/h)	968 hPa (28.59 inHg)	Leeward Islands, Bermuda, North Carolina, Newfoundland	0	$8.9 million	
Erin	August 18–27, 1989	105 mph (165 km/h)	968 hPa (28.59 inHg)	Cape Verde	0	None	

=== 1990s ===
Name	Duration	Peak intensity		Areas affected	Damage (USD)	Deaths	Refs
Name	Duration	Wind speed	Pressure	Areas affected	Damage (USD)	Deaths	Refs
Diana	August 4 – 9, 1990	100 mph (155 km/h)	980 hPa (28.94 inHg)	Central America	$90.7 million	139	
Isidore	September 4 – 17, 1990	100 mph (155 km/h)	978 hPa (28.88 inHg)	None	None	None	
Grace	October 25 – 29, 1991	105 mph (165 km/h)	980 hPa (28.94 inHg)	None	None	None	
Bonnie	September 17 – 30, 1992	110 mph (175 km/h)	965 hPa (28.50 inHg)	Azores	Minimal	1	
Charley	September 21 – 27, 1992	110 mph (175 km/h)	965 hPa (28.50 inHg)	Azores	None	None	
Gert	September 14 – 21, 1993	100 mph (155 km/h)	970 hPa (28.64 inHg)	Central America	>$170 million	116	
Florence	November 2 – 8, 1994	110 mph (175 km/h)	972 hPa (28.70 inHg)	None	None	None	
Erin	July 31 – August 6, 1995	100 mph (155 km/h)	973 hPa (28.73 inHg)	Florida, Mid-Atlantic States, New England	$700 million	13	
Humberto	August 21 – September 1, 1995	110 mph (175 km/h)	968 hPa (28.59 inHg)	None	None	None	
Iris	August 22 – September 4, 1995	110 mph (175 km/h)	965 hPa (28.50 inHg)	Antigua, Montserrat, Barbuda	Unknown	5	
Danielle	August 24 – September 3, 1998	105 mph (165 km/h)	960 hPa (28.35 inHg)	Puerto Rico, United States East Coast, Atlantic Canada, United Kingdom	$50 million	None	
Earl	August 31 – September 3, 1998	100 mph (155 km/h)	985 hPa (29.09 inHg)	Mexico, Florida	$79 million	3	
Jeanne	September 21 – October 1, 1998	105 mph (165 km/h)	969 hPa (28.61 inHg)	None	None	None	
Karl	September 23 – 28, 1998	105 mph (165 km/h)	970 hPa (28.64 inHg)	None	None	None	
Dennis	August 24 – September 7, 1999	105 mph (165 km/h)	962 hPa (28.41 inHg)	The Bahamas, United States East Coast, Atlantic Canada	$157 million	4	
Irene	October 12 – 19, 1999	110 mph (175 km/h)	958 hPa (28.29 inHg)	Cuba, Southeastern United States	$800 million	18	
Jose	October 17 – 25, 1999	100 mph (155 km/h)	979 hPa (28.91 inHg)	Lesser Antilles, Puerto Rico	<$5 million	2	

=== 2000s ===
Name	Dates	Peak intensity		Areas affected	Deaths	Damage (USD)	Refs
Name	Dates	Wind speed	Pressure	Areas affected	Deaths	Damage (USD)	Refs
Michael	October 15 – 20, 2000	100 mph (155 km/h)	965 hPa (28.50 inHg)	Bermuda, United States East Coast, Atlantic Canada	Minimal	None	
Humberto	September 21 – 27, 2001	105 mph (165 km/h)	970 hPa (28.64 inHg)	None	None	None	
Gustav	September 8 – 12, 2002	100 mph (155 km/h)	960 hPa (28.35 inHg)	North Carolina, Virginia, New Jersey	$340,000	4	
Juan	September 24 – 29, 2003	110 mph (175 km/h)	969 hPa (28.61 inHg)	Canada	$200 million	8	
Danielle	August 13 – 21, 2004	110 mph (175 km/h)	964 hPa (28.47 inHg)	Cape Verde	None	None	
Irene	August 4 – 18, 2005	105 mph (165 km/h)	970 hPa (28.64 inHg)	United States East Coast	None	1	
Dolly	July 20 – 27, 2008	100 mph (155 km/h)	963 hPa (28.44 inHg)	Guatemala, Mexico, South Central United States	$1.6 billion	26	
Ida	November 1 – 10, 2009	105 mph (165 km/h)	975 hPa (28.79 inHg)	Nicaragua, Yucatán Peninsula, Cuba, Southeastern United States	$11.4 million	4	

=== 2010s ===
Name	Dates	Peak intensity		Areas affected	Deaths	Damage (USD)	Refs
Name	Dates	Wind speed	Pressure	Areas affected	Deaths	Damage (USD)	Refs
Alex	June 25 – July 2, 2010	110 mph (175 km/h)	946 hPa (27.94 inHg)	Greater Antilles, Belize, Mexico, Texas	1.52 billion	52	
Paula	October 11 – 15, 2010	105 mph (165 km/h)	981 hPa (28.97 inHg)	Nicaragua, Honduras, Mexico; Cuba, Bahamas, Florida	Unknown	1	
Richard	October 20 – 26, 2010	100 mph (155 km/h)	977 hPa (28.85 inHg)	Honduras, Belize, Guatemala, Mexico	$80 million	2	
Tomas	October 29 – November 7, 2010	100 mph (155 km/h)	982 hPa (29.00 inHg)	Windward Islands, Leeward Antilles; Greater Antilles, Lucayan Archipelago	$463 million	51	
Ernesto	August 1 – 10, 2012	100 mph (155 km/h)	973 hPa (28.73 inHg)	Windward Islands, Jamaica, Central America, Mexico	252 million	12	
Gordon	August 15 – 20, 2012	110 mph (175 km/h)	965 hPa (28.50 inHg)	Azores	None	None	
Kirk	August 28 – September 4, 2012	105 mph (165 km/h)	970 hPa (28.64 inHg)	None	None	None	
Arthur	July 1 – 5, 2014	100 mph (155 km/h)	973 hPa (28.73 inHg)	Bahamas, North Carolina, Nova Scotia	$28.6 million	1	
Gert	August 12 – 17, 2017	110 mph (175 km/h)	962 hPa (28.41 inHg)	Bermuda, United States East Coast, Atlantic Canada	Unknown	2	
Katia	September 5 – 9, 2017	105 mph (165 km/h)	972 hPa (28.70 inHg)	Mexico	$3.26 million	3	
Chris	July 6 – 12, 2018	105 mph (165 km/h)	969 hPa (28.61 inHg)	Bermuda, Iceland	Minimal	1	
Helene	September 7 – 16, 2018	110 mph (175 km/h)	967 hPa (28.56 inHg)	West Africa, Cape Verde, Azores	Minimal	3	
Oscar	October 26 – 31, 2018	110 mph (175 km/h)	966 hPa (28.53 inHg)	Faroe Islands	None	None	
Jerry	September 17 – 24, 2019	105 mph (165 km/h)	976 hPa (28.82 inHg)	None	None	None	

=== 2020s ===
Name	Dates	Peak intensity		Areas affected	Deaths	Damage (USD)	Refs
Name	Dates	Wind speed	Pressure	Areas affected	Deaths	Damage (USD)	Refs
Paulette	September 7 – 22, 2020	105 mph (165 km/h)	965 hPa (28.50 inHg)	Bermuda	2	$50 million	
Sally	September 11 – 17, 2020	110 mph (175 km/h)	965 hPa (28.50 inHg)	The Bahamas, Cuba, United States Gulf Coast	9	$7.3 billion	
Earl	September 2 – 10, 2022	110 mph (175 km/h)	948 hPa (27.99 inHg)	Puerto Rico, Bermuda	2	Minimal	
Nigel	September 15 – 22, 2023	100 mph (155 km/h)	971 hPa (28.67 inHg)	None	None	None	
Tammy	October 18 – 29, 2023	110 mph (175 km/h)	965 hPa (28.50 inHg)	Leeward Islands	None	$1.5 million	
Ernesto	August 12 – 20, 2024	100 mph (155 km/h)	968 hPa (28.59 inHg)	Leeward Islands, Puerto Rico, Bermuda, Atlantic Canada	3	$150 million	
Francine	September 9 – 12, 2024	105 mph (165 km/h)	972 hPa (28.70 inHg)	Eastern Mexico, United States Gulf Coast	None	$1.3 billion	
Isaac	September 25 – 30, 2024	105 mph (165 km/h)	963 hPa (28.44 inHg)	None	None	None	
Leslie	October 2 – 12, 2024	105 mph (165 km/h)	972 hPa (28.70 inHg)	None	None	None	

=== Other systems ===
The 1842 Spain hurricane on October 26, reached a possible, but HURDAT-unverified, Category 2 intensity.

In May 1863, Hurricane "Amanda" wreaked havoc in the Southeast United States. Its intensity was equivalent to Category 2.

==== Michael Chenoweth ====
A climate researcher: Michael Chenoweth has suggested that the following systems were Category 2 hurricanes on the Saffir-Simpson hurricane wind scale:

Name	Duration	Peak intensity		Areas affected	Damage (USD)	Deaths	Refs
Name	Duration	Wind speed	Pressure	Areas affected	Damage (USD)	Deaths	Refs
Unnamed	September 25 - 28, 1852	105 mph (165 km/h)	Not Specified	None	None	None	
Unnamed	November 13 - 28, 1853	105 mph (165 km/h)	965 hPa (28.50 inHg)	The Bahamas	Unknown	Unknown	
Unnamed	October 13 - 27, 1854	105 mph (165 km/h)	965 hPa (28.50 inHg)	Texas, Mexico	Unknown	Unknown	
Eight	October 24 – 29, 1859	100 mph (155 km/h)	989 hPa (29.21 inHg)	Mexico, Florida	Unknown	Unknown	
Unnamed	September 24 - October 2, 1876	110 mph (175 km/h)	1002 hPa (29.59 inHg)	The Caribbean	Unknown	Unknown	

== Climatology ==
Category 2 hurricanes by month
Month	Number of storms
January	0
February	0
March	1
April	0
May	0
June	10
July	18
August	66
September	88
October	55
November	8
December	0

Category 2 hurricanes by decade
Decade	Number of storms
1850s	11
1860s	28
1870s	14
1880s	18
1890s	22
1900s	13
1910s	11
1920s	9
1930s	13
1940s	19
1950s	18
1960s	11
1970s	8
1980s	8
1990s	17
2000s	8
2010s	14
2020s	9

== Landfalls ==
Name	Year	Category 2	Category 1	Tropical storm	Tropical depression	Refs
Two	1940	Texas	—	—	—	
Three	1940	South Carolina	—	—	—	
Four	1940	—	—	Nova Scotia	—	
Five	1940	—	Nova Scotia	—	—	
Eleven	1942	Belize	Cuba	Campeche	—	
One	1943	Texas	—	—	—	
Six	1943	—	—	—	Louisiana	
One	1945	—	Florida and North Carolina	—	—	
Eleven	1945	Cuba	—	—	—	
Four	1946	—	—	Andros Island and South Abaco	—	
Six	1946	—	Cuba and Florida	—	—	
Charlie	1947	Tamaulipas	—	Quintana Roo	—	
King	1947	Georgia	Florida	Cuba	—	
Eleven	1949	Texas	—	Guatemala	—	
Baker	1950	Antigua	Alabama	Puerto Rico and Cuba	Cuba	
Item	1950	Veracruz	—	—	—	
How	1951	—	—	Florida	—	
Able	1952	South Carolina	—	—	—	
Alice	1954	Texas	—	—	—	
Diane	1955	—	North Carolina	—	—	
Katie	1955	Haiti	—	—	—	
Greta	1956	Haiti	Cuba	Texas	—	
Janice	1958	—	—	Cuba and Andros Island	—	
Anna	1961	—	Belize	—	—	
Edith	1963	—	Saint Lucia	Dominican Republic	—	
Ginny	1963	Nova Scotia	—	—	—	
Laurie	1969	—	—	—	Quintana Roo and Tabasco	
Ginger	1971	—	North Carolina	—	—	
Fifi	1974	Belize	—	—	—	
Gert	1981	—	—	Puerto Rico	—	
Dean	1989	—	—	Newfoundland	—	
Diana	1990	Tamaulipas	—	Quintana Roo	—	
Charley	1992	—	—	Azores	—	
Gert	1993	Veracruz	—	Nicaragua and Belize	—	
Erin	1995	—	Abaco Islands, Grand Bahama and Florida (x2)	—	—	
Iris	1995	—	—	Montserrat, Anguilla and Barbuda	—	
Earl	1998	—	Florida	—	—	
Dennis	1999	—	—	North Carolina	—	
Irene	1999	—	Florida	Cuba (x2)	—	
Jose	1999	—	Antigua	Tortola	—	
Gustav	2002	—	Nova Scotia and Newfoundland	—	—	
Juan	2003	Nova Scotia	—	Prince Edward Island	—	
Dolly	2008	—	Texas	Quintana Roo	—	
Ida	2009	—	Nicaragua	—	—	
Alex	2010	Tamaulipas	—	Belize	—	
Paula	2010	—	—	Cuba	—	
Richard	2010	Belize	—	—	—	
Tomas	2010	Saint Vincent	—	Barbados	—	
Ernesto	2012	Quintana Roo	—	Veracruz	—	
Gordon	2012	—	Azores	—	—	
Arthur	2014	North Carolina	—	—	—	
Katia	2017	—	Veracruz	—	—	
Paulette	2020	Bermuda	—	—	—	
Sally	2020	Alabama	—	—	Florida	
Tammy	2023	—	Barbuda	—	—	
Ernesto	2024	—	Bermuda	Guadeloupe and Virgin Islands	—	
Francine	2024	Louisiana	—	—	—	

== See also ==
- List of Category 2 Pacific hurricanes
