= 1945 Florida–Outer Banks hurricane =

Category 2 Atlantic hurricane in 1945

Hurricane One
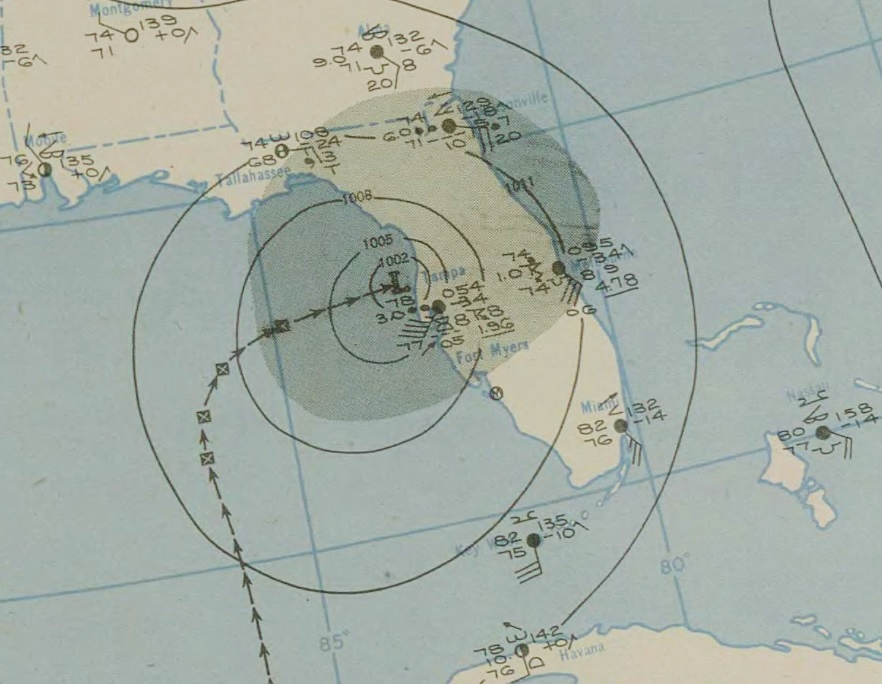
- Surface weather analysis of the hurricane nearing landfall in Florida on June 24

Meteorological history
- Formed: June 20, 1945
- Extratropical: June 27, 1945
- Dissipated: July 4, 1945

Category 2 hurricane
- 1-minute sustained (SSHWS/NWS)
- Highest winds: 100 mph (155 km/h)
- Highest gusts: 115 mph (185 km/h) (estimated)
- Lowest pressure: <989 mbar (hPa); <29.21 inHg (lowest directly measured)

Overall effects
- Fatalities: 1
- Damage: >$81,000 (1945 USD)
- Areas affected: Florida; Georgia; Carolinas; Mid-Atlantic; New England; Atlantic Canada
- IBTrACS
- Part of the 1945 Atlantic hurricane season

The 1945 Florida–Outer Banks hurricane was a moderate Atlantic hurricane that tracked along the East Coast of the United States from Florida to the Carolinas in the first month of the annual season. The first tropical storm and hurricane of the year, it developed on June 20 in the western Caribbean off Mexico. For the next few days, it moved generally northward into the Gulf of Mexico. Reaching hurricane intensity on June 23, it then turned northeast toward the Florida peninsula, briefly peaked with winds of 100 mph (155 km/h), and rapidly weakened thereafter. It made landfall in the Big Bend on June 24 as a minimal hurricane, weakening to a tropical storm inland. Mostly minor wind damage, along with a few tornadoes, was reported in Florida, but the storm produced heavy—though largely beneficial—rains that eased one of the state's worst recorded droughts, while causing flash floods that wrecked bridges.

Upon entering the Atlantic Ocean, the storm regained hurricane status, paralleling the East Coast. On June 26, it struck North Carolina's Outer Banks as a marginal hurricane, producing minor damage but heavy rainfall. Continuing northeast, the cyclone delivered gale-force winds to New York and southern New England, causing traffic accidents, including a fatality, and mild wind damage. Heavy rains drenched the area, and high waves offshore caused passengers aboard ships on Long Island Sound to need rescue. Peak winds on land reached 66 mph (106 km/h), forcing ships to remain in port, while authorities sought to escort ships at sea into safe harbor. Overall, the impact of the storm was slight, though air temperatures fell almost 20 °F (−7 °C) the day after the storm. Inclusive of tornadoes, losses from the storm surpassed $81,000.

== Meteorological history ==
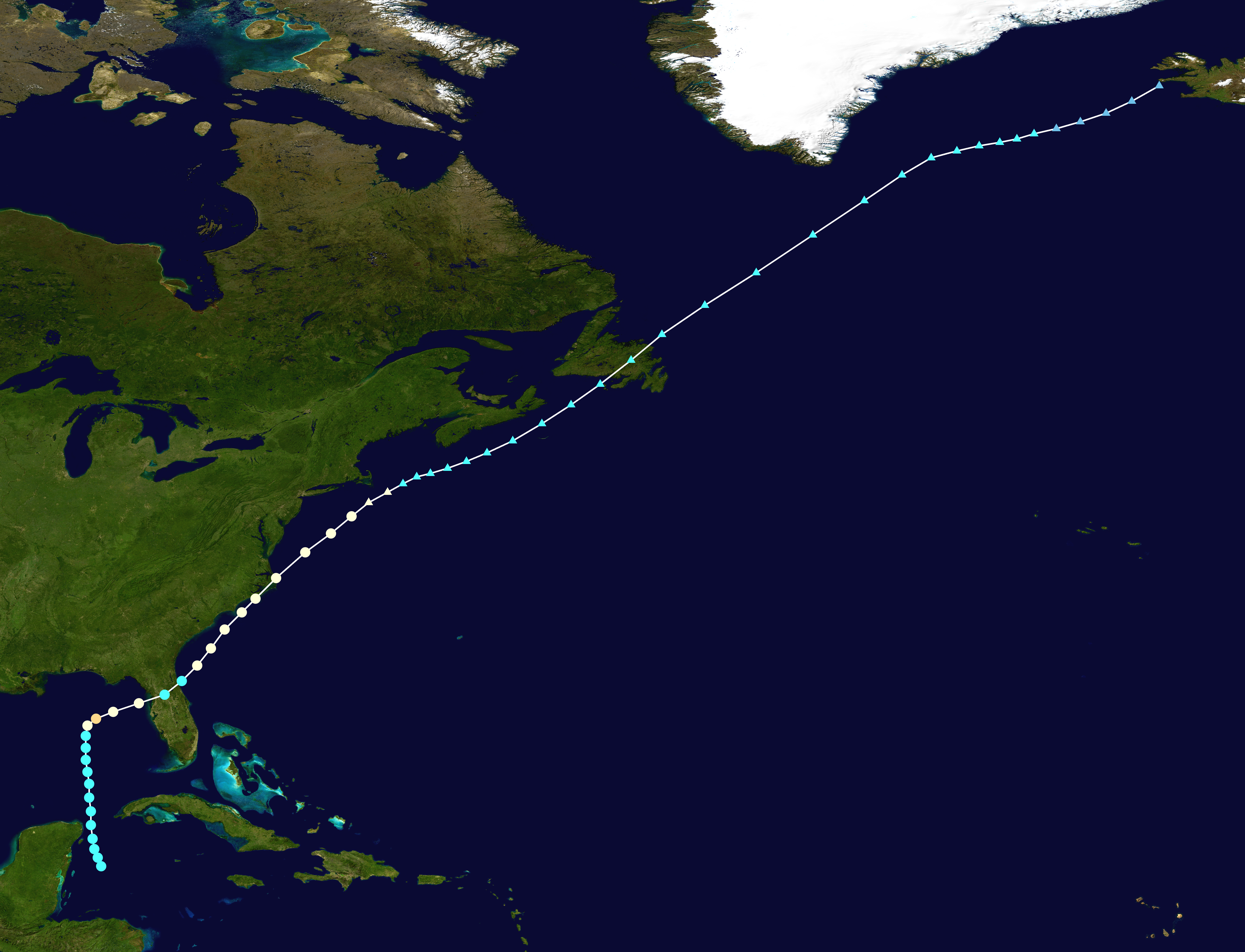
Map plotting the storm's track and intensity, according to the Saffir–Simpson scale Map key Saffir–Simpson scale Tropical depression (≤38 mph, ≤62 km/h) Tropical storm (39–73 mph, 63–118 km/h) Category 1 (74–95 mph, 119–153 km/h) Category 2 (96–110 mph, 154–177 km/h) Category 3 (111–129 mph, 178–208 km/h) Category 4 (130–156 mph, 209–251 km/h) Category 5 (≥157 mph, ≥252 km/h) Unknown Storm type Tropical cyclone Subtropical cyclone Extratropical cyclone, remnant low, tropical disturbance, or monsoon depression

The genesis of the storm was from a tropical disturbance detected between Swan Island and the Honduran coast on June 19; however, nearby surface data did not confirm a well-organized circulation until the following day, when the United States Air Force dispatched aircraft to surveil the system. Based on gale reports from the plane, the Atlantic hurricane database (HURDAT) initiated a tropical storm about 120 mi (195 km) southeast of Cozumel, an island in the northwestern Caribbean off Mexico's Yucatán Peninsula. The storm tracked northward toward the Yucatán Channel, marked by slight squalls and sustained winds of up to 45 mph (75 km/h), an intensity derived from pressure–wind relationships based on peripheral air pressures from Cozumel. It strengthened but slightly until it reached the southeastern Gulf of Mexico on June 22, at which point it underwent a phase of rapid intensification, reaching hurricane status a day later and peaking with winds of 100 mph (155 km/h)—equal to Category 2 on the modern Saffir–Simpson scale—as judged by the Atlantic hurricane reanalysis project, based on a blend of observations with values ranging up to 100 kn (115 mph; 185 km/h) by reconnaissance pilots; visually evaluated, these were determined to be gusts or doubtful, due to systemic errors, often biased high, in wind estimates under extreme states. (Note: Early aircraft reports, whenever skies allowed, deduced near-surface (i.e., within 10 m (33 ft) above sea level) wind speed from the condition of the sea, as seen by aviators, using the Beaufort scale as a baseline and defining higher values if proper.)

During peak intensity the trajectory of the storm sharply veered east-northeastward, toward the western Florida peninsula. Continuing north of due east, the hurricane quickly weakened, sped landward, and struck near Pine Island in Hernando County, Florida, at 08:00 UTC on June 24. Passing inland, it threaded the towns of Brooksville and Dunnellon, north of the Tampa Bay area. In-situ observations were scarce due to low population densities, but winds around the eye at landfall were estimated to be near 80 mph (130 km/h), ranking the storm a Category 1 cyclone in Florida. The storm bent northeast as it crossed North Florida, reaching the Atlantic coast between St. Augustine and Daytona Beach as a moderate tropical storm. Moving offshore parallel to the Southeast, it rapidly regained force and restrengthened into a low-end hurricane early on June 25. The following morning, it made a second landfall near Harkers Island, North Carolina, with winds of 75 mph (120 km/h), though these velocities only buffeted ships at sea. Brushing Cape Hatteras, the storm generated a pressure of 989 mb (29.2 inHg) there, the lowest measured in its lifespan. Enclosed by hurricane winds, its eye transited the Outer Banks and reemerged over water at Oregon Inlet, near Wanchese. On June 27 the storm transformed into a nontropical system and shed hurricane-force winds, while angling east-northeast for a day. On June 28–29 it passed south of Nova Scotia, a province in the Canadian Maritimes, and just north of Miquelon-Langlade, Saint Pierre and Miquelon, before moving onshore a day later near Seal Cove, Newfoundland, with winds of 40 mph (65 km/h). Afterward, the system headed northeast and east-northeast for four more days, ending near Iceland on July 4.

== Warnings and preparations ==
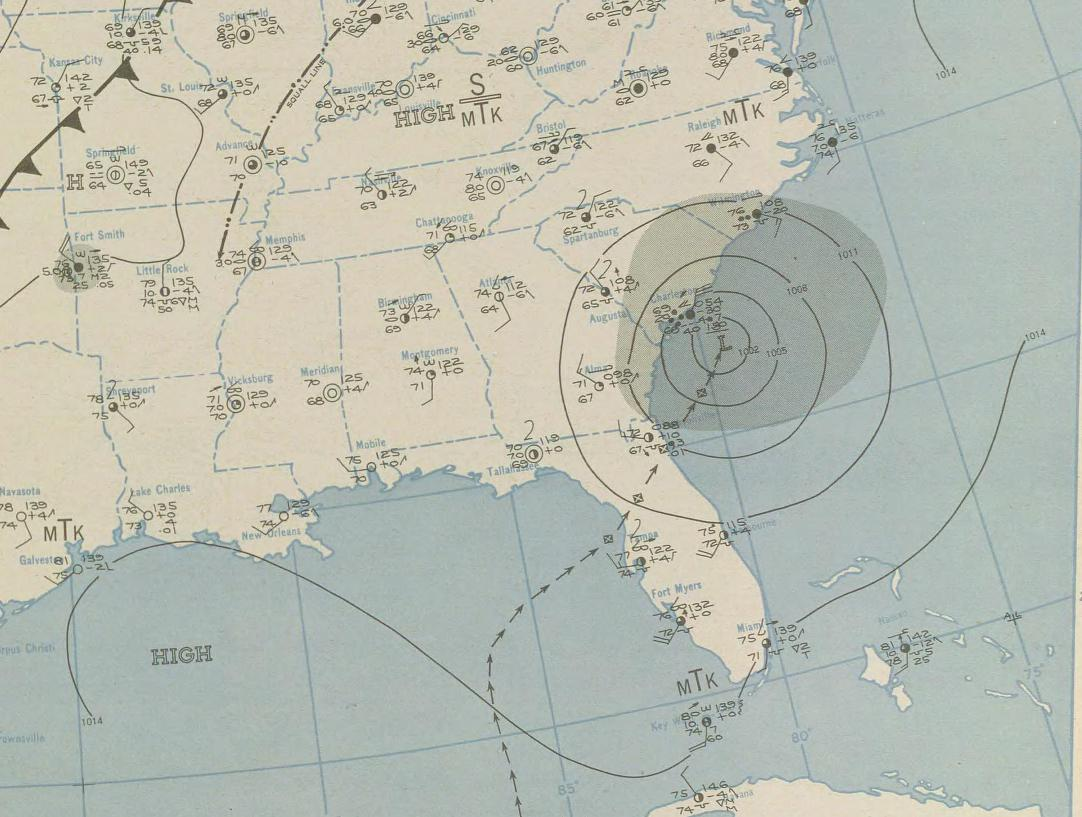
Weather map showing the storm off Savannah on June 25

As early as June 19, the United States Weather Bureau began sending reconnaissance missions to monitor the developing storm in the Caribbean. The regular reports sent by the airplanes provided valuable data about the intensity of the small cyclone. Expecting strong winds in the island chain, on June 21 the Bureau released storm warnings for the Florida Keys; the agency also notified Cuba of the storm. On June 23, the Weather Bureau office in New Orleans advised residents from Mobile, Alabama, to Cedar Key, Florida, to prepare for gales. Areas from Tampa, Florida, to Grand Isle, Louisiana, were placed under a storm warning, with the center of the storm expected to strike land next morning between Mobile and Panama City, Florida; the predicted impact zone was later shifted eastward, to a point between Tampa and Cross City, Florida. Hurricane warnings were issued for the coastline between Tampa and Carrabelle, with storm warnings from Punta Gorda to Titusville. As the hurricane moved closer to Florida's Big Bend, storm warnings were extended up the Eastern Seaboard to Savannah, Georgia; storm warnings eventually reached Norfolk, Virginia, with hurricane warnings up to Cape Hatteras.

The city of Tallahassee prepared to receive evacuees, and evacuations were ordered for coastal communities in the Big Bend. The Florida Highway Patrol warned local residents to leave the area, and soldiers were transported out of Camp Gordon Johnston. Military planes at bases in the warned areas were secured or flown to safer spots, including as many as 400 Florida aircraft that were rerouted to Alabama. Once the storm left Florida, additional evacuations commenced between Georgetown, South Carolina, and Cape Hatteras, including the North Carolina communities of Wilmington, Morehead City, and nearby resort towns. Large-scale evacuations targeting low-lying areas such as barrier islands involved 5,000 people from the Wilmington area alone and were credited with reducing loss of life. Meanwhile, storm warnings were extended northward to Norfolk, Virginia, and eventually Atlantic City, New Jersey; small watercraft in the Northeastern United States were advised to stay in port.

== Impact ==
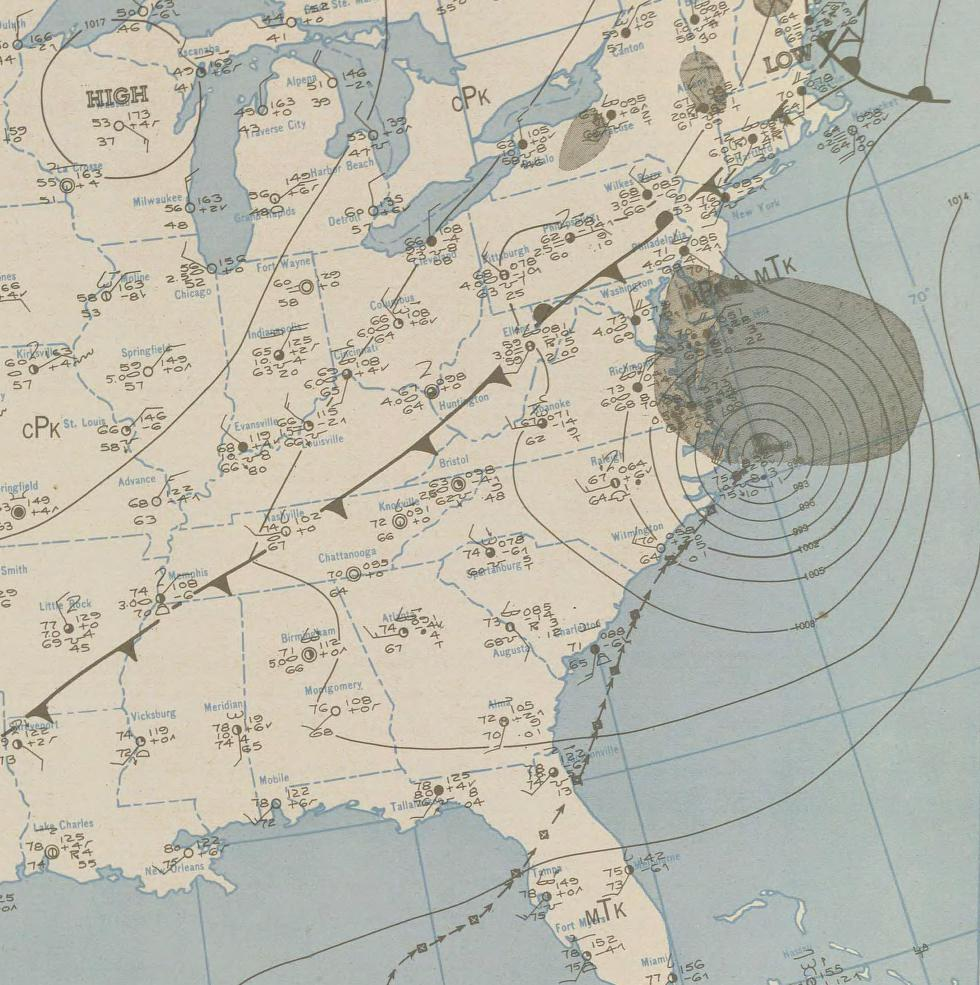
Weather maps showing the hurricane off North Carolina on June 26

In Florida the areal scope of the storm was limited, little more than 100 mi (160 km) across, and its eye width was calculated at 25 mi (40 km). Modest winds were reported as the storm bisected Florida, with stations across the peninsula measuring 45 to 55 mph (72 to 89 km/h); an isolated gust to 68 mph (109 km/h) occurred in St. Petersburg. The winds defoliated citrus trees and downed utility lines near the point of landfall, momentarily cutting communication. Fallen wires ignited three small fires in St. Petersburg. In Pinellas County the storm felled fewer poles and wires than a storm the previous year, but disrupted telephone service more widely, perhaps due to a lingering drought. Heavy rains in the path of the storm lowered the wind resistance of vegetation by saturating soils and thereby detaching root balls, while a trail of broken tree branches, leaf litter, and leaky roofs from wind-driven rain reached across the state. Winds damaged citrus trees, mostly slightly, as far inland as Orlando, tossing or scarring fruit and flowers, but their overall effects were minimal.

Throughout its path, the hurricane generated prolific rains, mostly southeast of its track. Totals statewide maximized at Lake Alfred, where a rain gauge amassed 13.6 in (350 mm); much of the deluge fell over citrus farms, with over 6 in (150 mm) soaking groves in Orange County. In St. Petersburg one-day rains ahead of the storm amounted to 6.08 in (154 mm), the heaviest since the October 1944 storm, while the Weather Bureau office in Tampa collected 10.42 in (265 mm), establishing a then-daily record there; the site registered 11 1/2 in (290 mm) in two days. Other copious totals were 10.43 in (265 mm) at Lakeland and 11.4 in (290 mm) recorded within a 24-hour period at West Palm Beach. The rains benefited the citrus industry, partly requiting aftereffects from the 1944 cyclone and relieving a yearlong drought, one of Florida's worst to date. The swift downpour engendered flash floods, eroding roads, engulfing lowlands, and destroying bridges. Hillsborough County alone lost 47 bridges, and rivers such as the Alafia rose up to 12 ft (3.7 m) in a five-hour period, flooding wide tracts. Damage in the Miami area totaled $75,000. The hurricane also produced two tornadoes in Florida, one near LaBelle and another near Melbourne, with a loss of $6,000. The LaBelle tornado cut a 440-yard (400 m) path, dislodging a house and leveling orange trees, while the Melbourne event downed a transformer and railing on a causeway in its 1-mile (1.6 km) path.

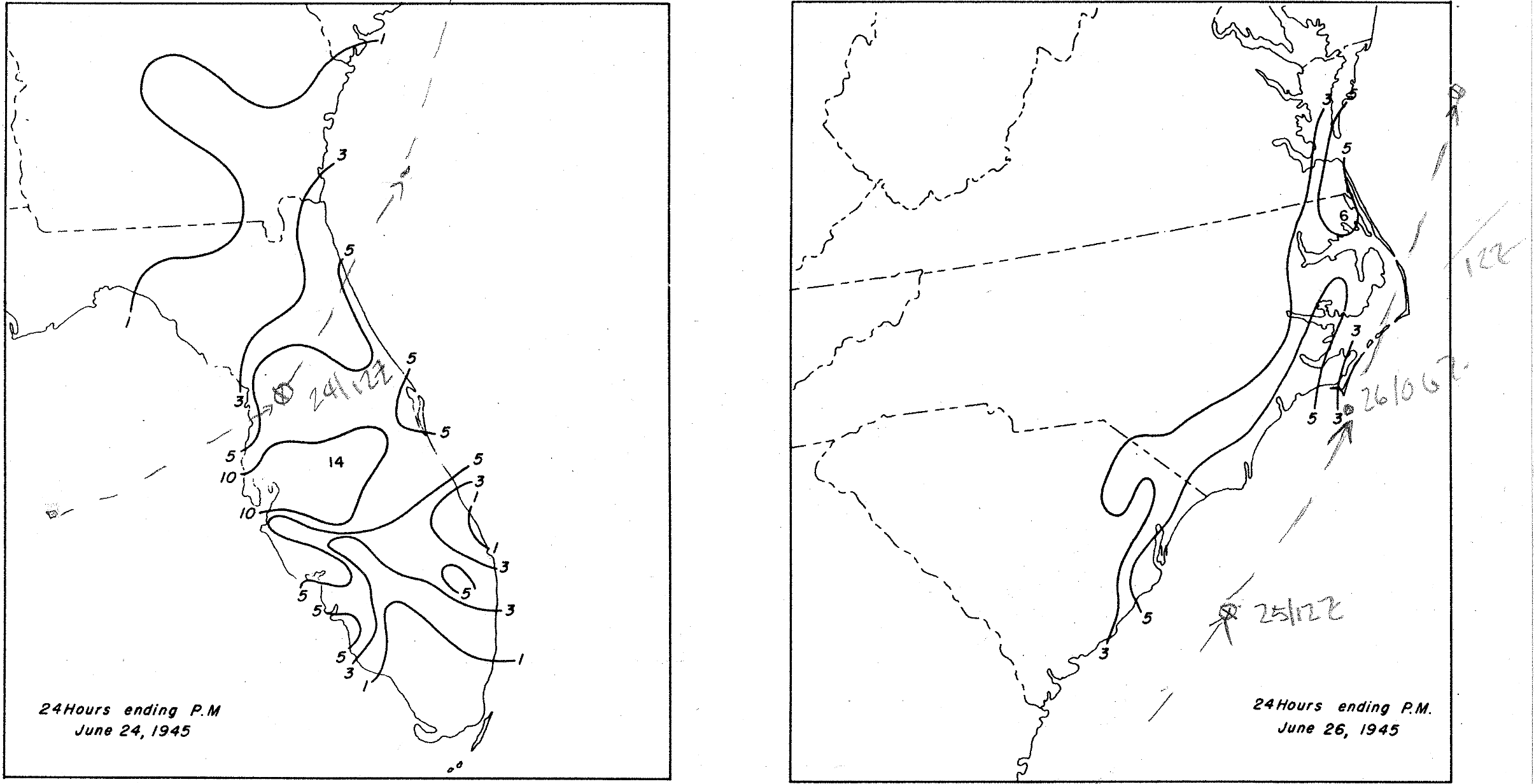
Charts showing total rainfall from the storm over Florida and the Carolinas

Along the Georgia coast, the hurricane produced only fringe impacts, including strong winds and heavy rain. Wind gusts to 70 mph (110 km/h) were reported from Tybee Island, and portions of coastal North Carolina received up to 8.24 in (209 mm) of rain; however, only minor impacts occurred north to Virginia, though telephone service shorted near Georgetown and rainfall damaged sewerage in Wilmington. In New York and New England, the rainbands of the hurricane produced gales and high surf; peak winds of up to 50 mph (80 km/h) whipped Long Island Sound, generating large waves that capsized some boats and caused people to need rescue. Offshore, even higher velocities—up to 66 mph (106 km/h)—battered a weather station on Nantucket, while hurricane-force winds swept Coast Guard vessels in the nearshore waters; the Coast Guard nonetheless sought to escort troubled ships into port. Heavy rainfall fell across coastal New England, peaking at 4.59 in (120 mm) on Nantucket. The heavy rains and gales lowered visibility, causing a fatal vehicle–pedestrian collision at Warwick, Rhode Island. The storm disabled at least 10,000 telephone lines, 7,000 of them in the Cape Cod region. Besides causing power outages, the stormy conditions damaged buildings and crops; in the Boston area, high winds knocked down trees and chimneys. A strong temperature gradient existed between the cyclone and the Northeast U.S.: in New York City, the daily high on June 26 was almost 20 °F (−7 °C) lower than the day prior. Canada received little damage.

== See also ==
- List of Florida hurricanes
- List of North Carolina hurricanes
- Hurricane Gladys (1968) – Took a similar path up the East Coast
