= 1855 Atlantic hurricane season =

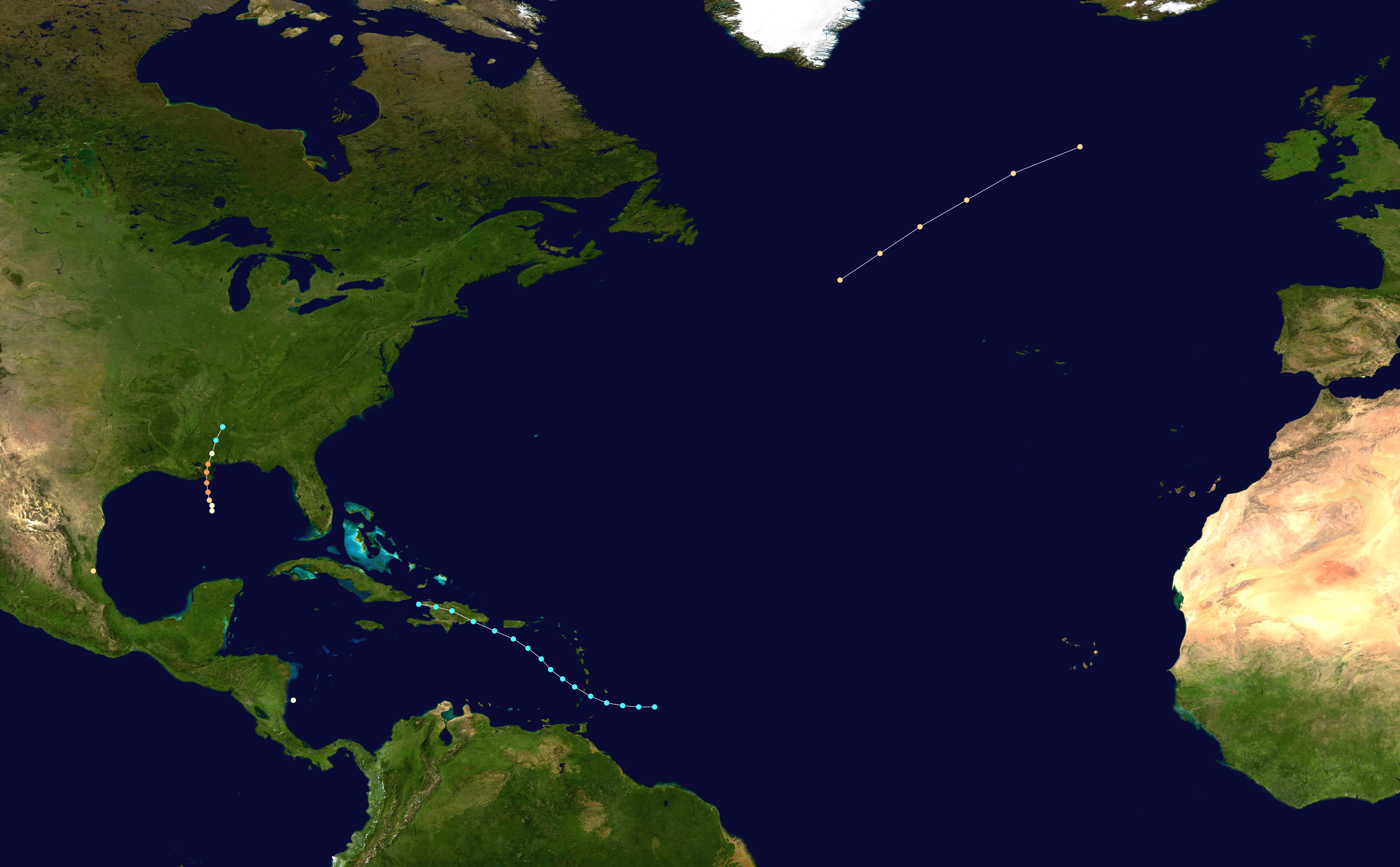
- Season summary map

Seasonal boundaries
- First system formed: August 5, 1855
- Last system dissipated: September 17, 1855

Strongest storm
- Name: Five
  - Maximum winds: 125 mph (205 km/h) (1-minute sustained)
  - Lowest pressure: 945 mbar (hPa; 27.91 inHg)

Seasonal statistics
- Total storms: 5
- Hurricanes: 4
- Major hurricanes (Cat. 3+): 1
- Total fatalities: 1
- Total damage: Unknown

The 1855 Atlantic hurricane season featured tropical cyclone landfalls in the Gulf Coast of the United States, the Greater Antilles, and Mexico, but none along the East Coast of the United States. It was inactive, with only five known tropical cyclones. Another tropical storm was believed to have existed offshore Atlantic Canada in late August and early September, but HURDAT – the official Atlantic hurricane database – now excludes this system. The first known system was initially observed on August 5, while the final known storm was last noted on September 17. These dates fall within the period with the most tropical cyclone activity in the Atlantic. At one point during the season, two tropical cyclones existed simultaneously. Two of the cyclones only have a single known point in their tracks due to a sparsity of data.

Of the season's five tropical cyclones, four reached hurricane status. Furthermore, one of those four strengthened into a major hurricane, which are Category 3 or higher on the modern-day Saffir–Simpson scale. The strongest cyclone of the season, the fifth system, peaked at Category 3 strength with 125 mph (205 km/h) winds. It reportedly produced some of the worst impacts in Louisiana and Mississippi since 1819 and killed at least one person in the latter. The first storm of the season brought locally severe impact to Tampico, Tamaulipas, in Mexico in early August. Additionally, the fourth storm caused severe damage in the Lesser Antilles.

== Systems ==
=== Hurricane One ===
- Category 2 hurricane (SSHWS)
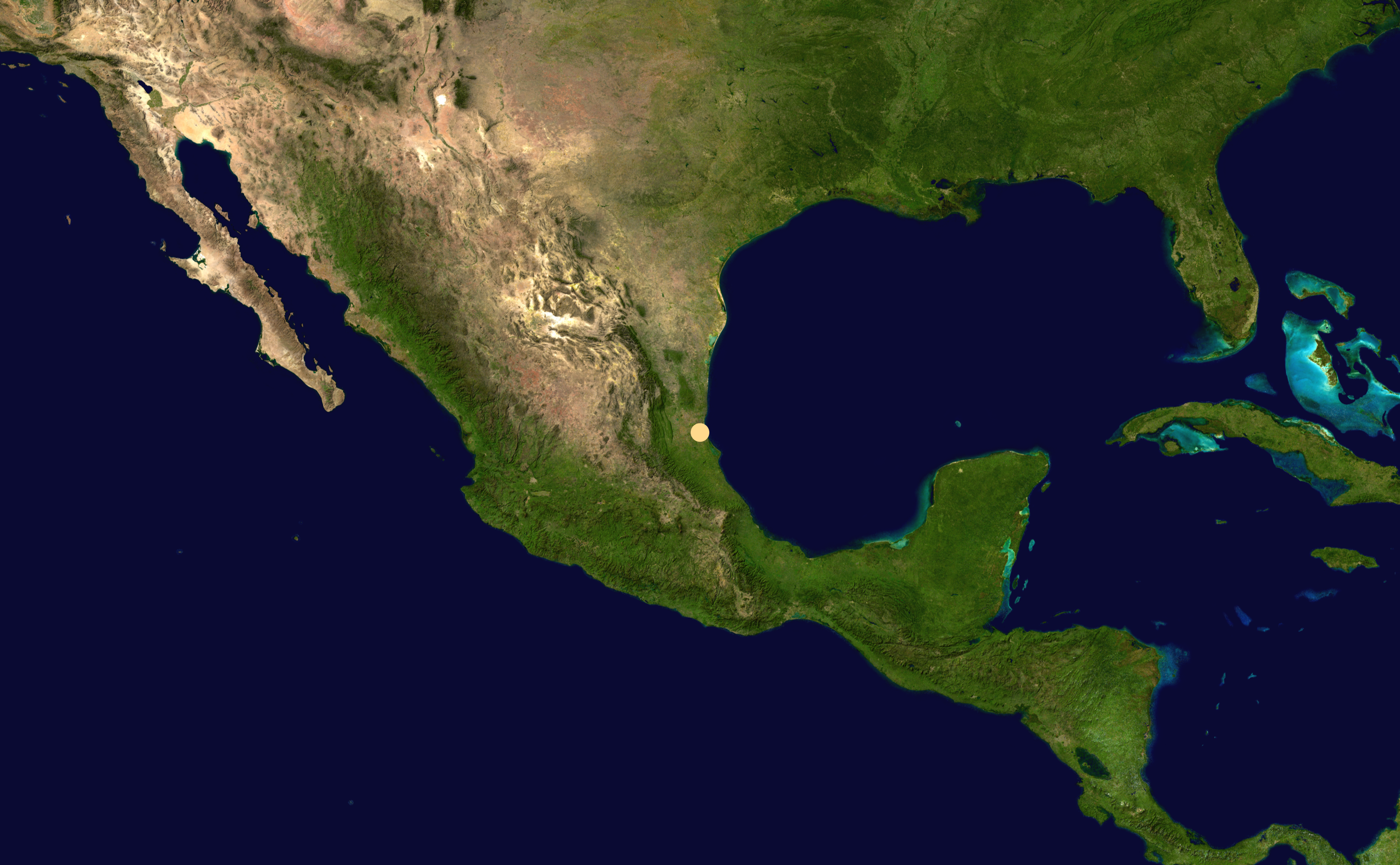
- Duration: August 6 – August 6
- Peak intensity: 105 mph (165 km/h) (1-min);

Based on newspaper reports, the first hurricane of the season was within the vicinity of Tampico, Tamaulipas, on August 6. Maximum sustained winds were at 105 mph (165 km/h), indicating a Category 2 hurricane. No further information is available on the meteorological history of this storm. However, it is possible that the storm developed in the Caribbean in late July, due to data obtained from the barque Bercaldine. Torrential rainfall in the Tampico area caused disastrous flooding, with heavy damage to goods and property. Eleven vessels were docked at Tampico, some of which lost their cargo. At the mouth of the Pánuco River, a pilot station and a fort were swept away. The event was considered the worst inundation of Tampico over the last 30 years.

=== Hurricane Two ===
- Category 2 hurricane (SSHWS)
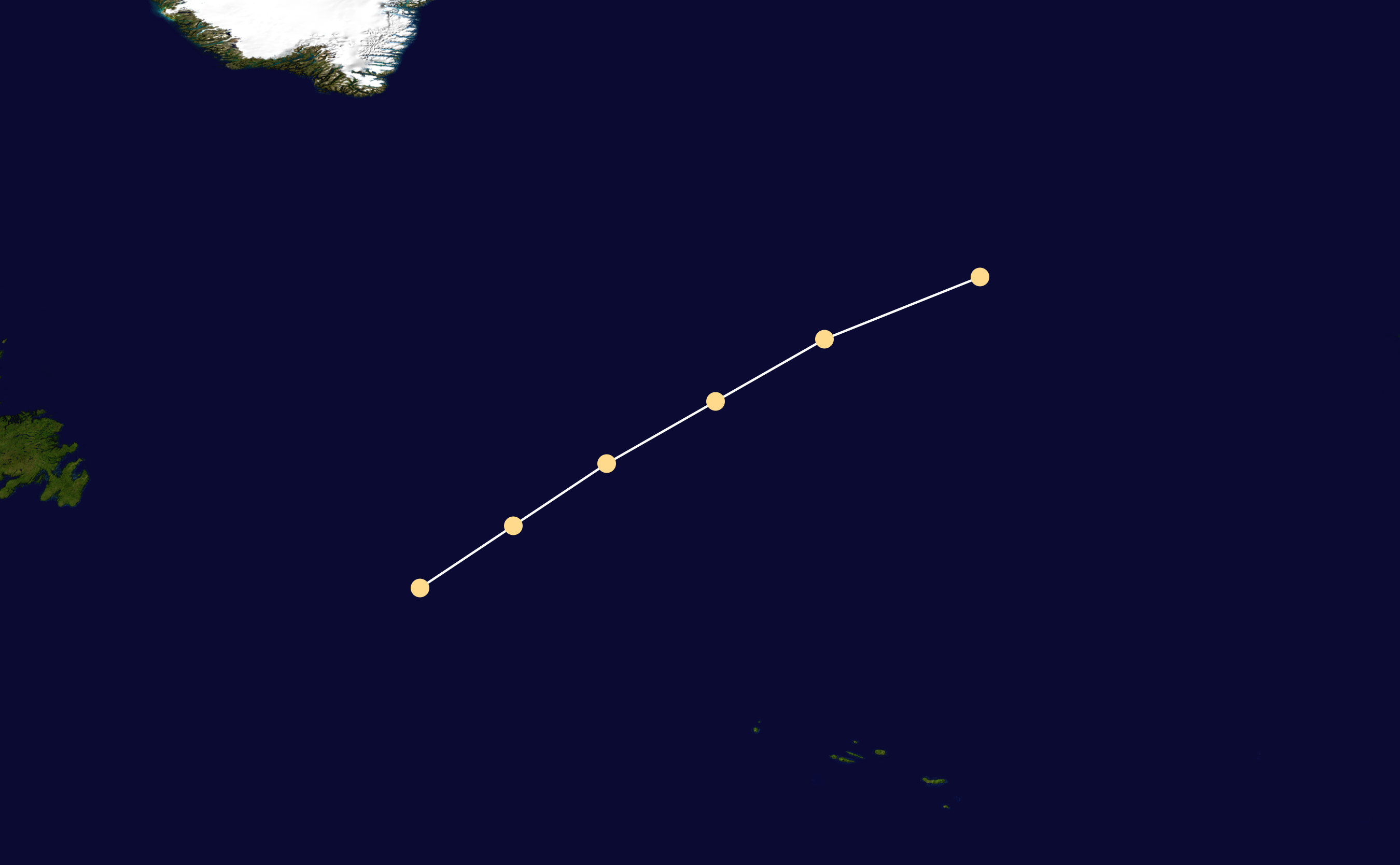
- Duration: August 10 – August 11
- Peak intensity: 105 mph (165 km/h) (1-min);

The ship James Foster Jr. encountered a hurricane on August 10, while located about 575 mi (925 km) east-southeast of Cape Race, Newfoundland. Sustained winds of 105 mph (165 km/h) were observed, equivalent to a Category 2 hurricane. Data from the James Foster Jr. and Rebecca indicate that the storm moved rapidly northeastward. This system was last noted about 560 mi (900 km) west of Ireland on August 11. Climate researcher Michael Chenoweth proposed the removal of this storm from HURDAT, noting "Insufficient supporting evidence from other neighboring data sources".

=== Hurricane Three ===
- Category 1 hurricane (SSHWS)
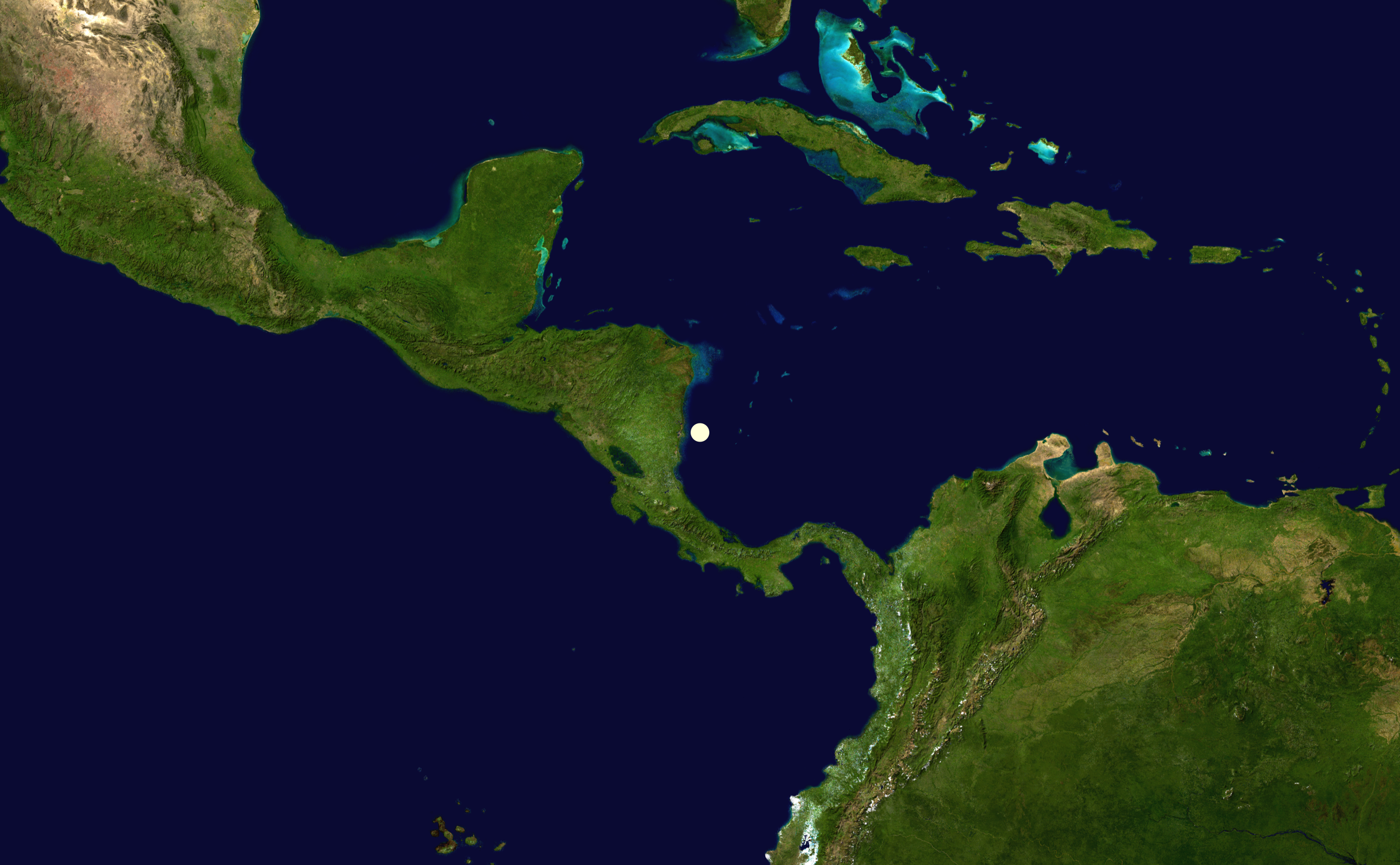
- Duration: August 11 – August 11
- Peak intensity: 80 mph (130 km/h) (1-min);

HMS Walverine reported a hurricane at 12.5°N, 83.0°W, which is located about 15 mi (25 km) north of Nicaragua's Corn Islands. A sustained wind speed of 80 mph (130 km/h) was observed. Shortly thereafter, HMS Walverine was wrecked and no further information is known about this storm. Chenoweth also argued for the exclusion of this cyclone from HURDAT, noting that logbooks do not seem to indicate the presence of the storm and Walverine actually sank due to crashing into rocks for reasons unrelated to weather.

=== Tropical Storm Four ===
- Tropical storm (SSHWS)
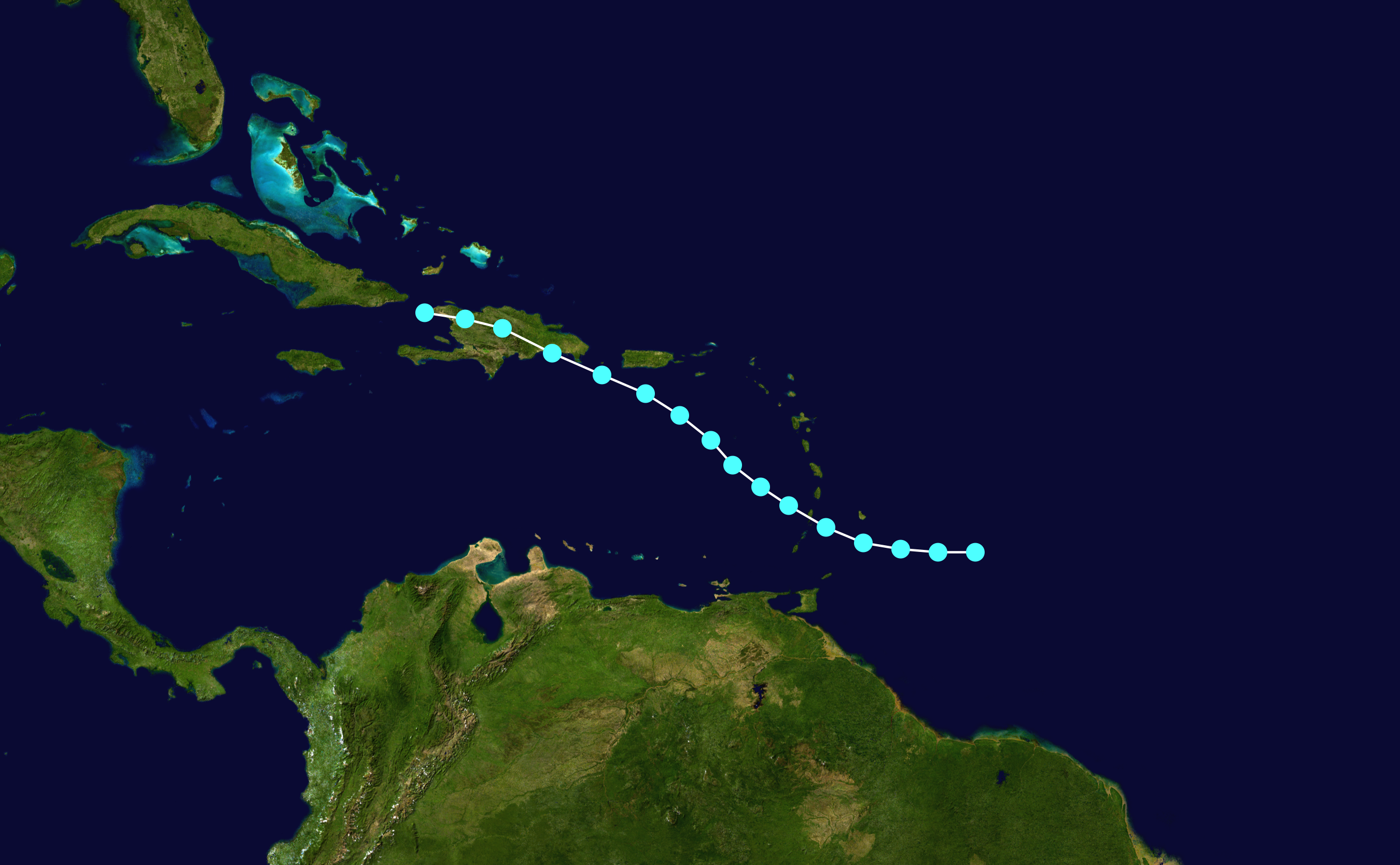
- Duration: August 24 – August 27
- Peak intensity: 70 mph (110 km/h) (1-min); 997 mbar (hPa)

Based on reports of a strong gale, a tropical storm was first tracked about 250 mi (400 km) east-southeast of Barbados early on August 24. It initially headed westward, before re-curving west-northwestward early on the following day. Shortly thereafter, the storm passed through the Windward Islands between Grenada and Saint Vincent and the Grenadines. The storm peaked with winds of 70 mph (110 km/h) while moving northwestward across the Caribbean Sea. It weakened slightly before making landfall near San Pedro de Macorís, Dominican Republic, with winds of 60 mph (95 km/h) early on August 27. The storm slowly weakened over Hispaniola and was last noted near Bombardopolis, Haiti, later that day.

Considerable damage occurred in the Lesser Antilles. On Saint Vincent, rains destroyed roads and a number of houses. Many sugar cane fields were also ruined. Several vessels were lost there and on other islands, including Barbados, Dominica, and Martinique. On Saint Croix in the present-day United States Virgin Islands, at least one vessel was destroyed by the heavy gales. There were also strong gales reported in Puerto Rico and the Dominican Republic.

=== Hurricane Five ===
- Category 3 hurricane (SSHWS)
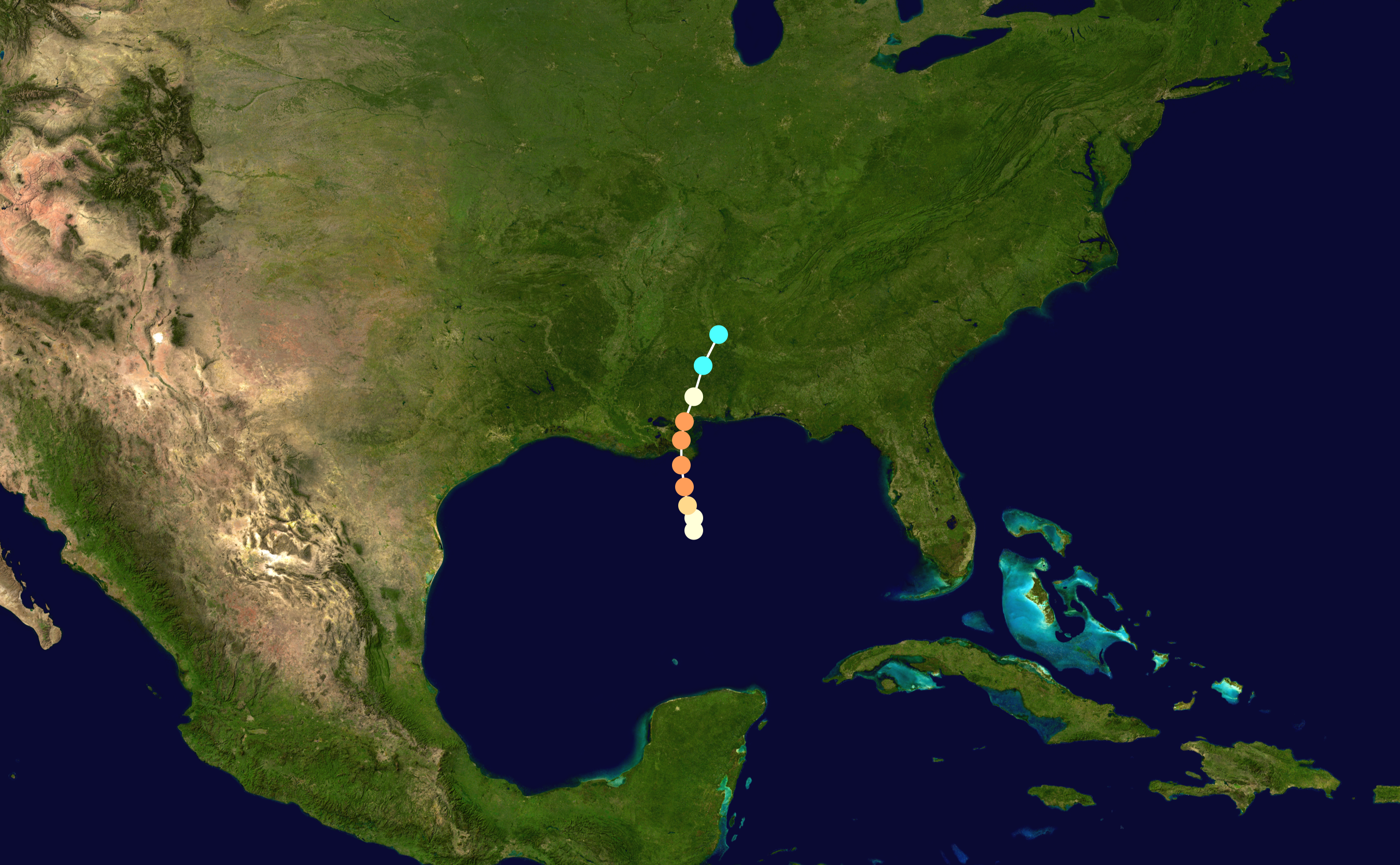
- Duration: September 15 – September 17
- Peak intensity: 125 mph (205 km/h) (1-min); 945 mbar (hPa)

The Middle Gulf Shore Hurricane of 1855

The ship Orphan encountered a hurricane with winds of 80 mph (130 km/h) in the central Gulf of Mexico on September 15. It strengthened quickly while moving northward, becoming a Category 2 hurricane later that day. By 00:00 UTC on September 16, the storm peaked as a Category 3 hurricane with maximum sustained winds of 125 mph (205 km/h), making it the strongest tropical cyclone of the season. Shortly thereafter, the hurricane made landfall near Buras-Triumph, Louisiana, at the same intensity. Based on the pressure-wind relationship, the storm had a minimum barometric pressure of approximately 945 mbar (27.9 inHg) upon striking the coast. It weakened after moving inland, decreasing to Category 1 intensity later on September 16. Early on the following day, the system weakened to a tropical storm, several hours before dissipating over central Alabama.

This was regarded as the worst hurricane in the region since 1819. In Louisiana, winds and storm surge impacted the eastern portions of the state. The wharf and bathhouse in Proctorville were swept away. About 4 ft (1.2 m) of water was reported at Proctor's Landing. A combination of strong winds and storm surge destroyed a number of houses along the shores of Lake Borgne. Along the coast of Mississippi, most structures were swept to sea. The foundation of the Biloxi Lighthouse was endangered due to erosion from this storm. Additionally, locals described the Cat Island Lighthouse as being left in "severe peril". Several ships were damaged or capsized in the Mississippi River, including Atchafalaya, J.S. Chenoweth, Ship Shoal, and Venice. One death occurred in Mississippi City after winds unroofed some lodging at the Teagarden Hotel, while two women may have drowned along the coast of the state.

=== Other systems ===
In addition to the five tropical systems, another storm was operationally believed to have existed in late August and early September. The ship Atlantic encountered a very heavy gale while located west of Sable Island, Nova Scotia, on August 31.The storm moved rapidly east-northeastward offshore Atlantic Canada. It was last noted on September 2, when the storm transitioned into an extratropical cyclone. However, HURDAT no longer includes this system in its database.

== Season effects ==
This is a table of all of the known storms that formed in the 1855 Atlantic hurricane season. It includes their duration (within the basin), areas affected, damages, and death totals. Deaths in parentheses are additional and indirect (an example of an indirect death would be a traffic accident), but were still related to that storm. Damage and deaths include totals while the storm was extratropical, a wave, or a low, and all of the damage figures are in 1855 USD.

Saffir–Simpson scale
| TD | TS | C1 | C2 | C3 | C4 | C5 |

1855 North Atlantic tropical cyclone season statistics
| Storm name | Dates active | Storm category at peak intensity | Max 1-min wind mph (km/h) | Min. press. (mbar) | Areas affected | Damage (US$) | Deaths | Ref(s). |
|---|---|---|---|---|---|---|---|---|
| One | August 6 | Category 2 hurricane | 105 (165) | Unknown | Mexico (Tamaulipas) | Unknown | Unknown | |
| Two | August 10–11 | Category 2 hurricane | 105 (165) | Unknown | None | None | None | |
| Three | August 11 | Category 1 hurricane | 80 (130) | Unknown | Nicaragua | Unknown | Unknown | |
| Four | August 24–27 | Tropical storm | 70 (110) | 997 | Lesser Antilles, Hispaniola (Dominican Republic) | Unknown | Unknown | |
| Five | September 15–17 | Category 3 hurricane | 125 (205) | 945 | Gulf Coast of the United States (Louisiana) | Unknown | 1 | |
Season aggregates
| 5 systems | August 6 – September 17 | | 125 (205) | 945 | | Unknown | 1 | |

== See also ==
- Lists of Atlantic hurricanes
- Tropical cyclone forecasting
- HURDAT – A comprehensive record of tropical cyclone tracks since 1851.
- Atlantic reanalysis project – A project to improve historical hurricane data for past storms.
