= List of Mississippi hurricanes =

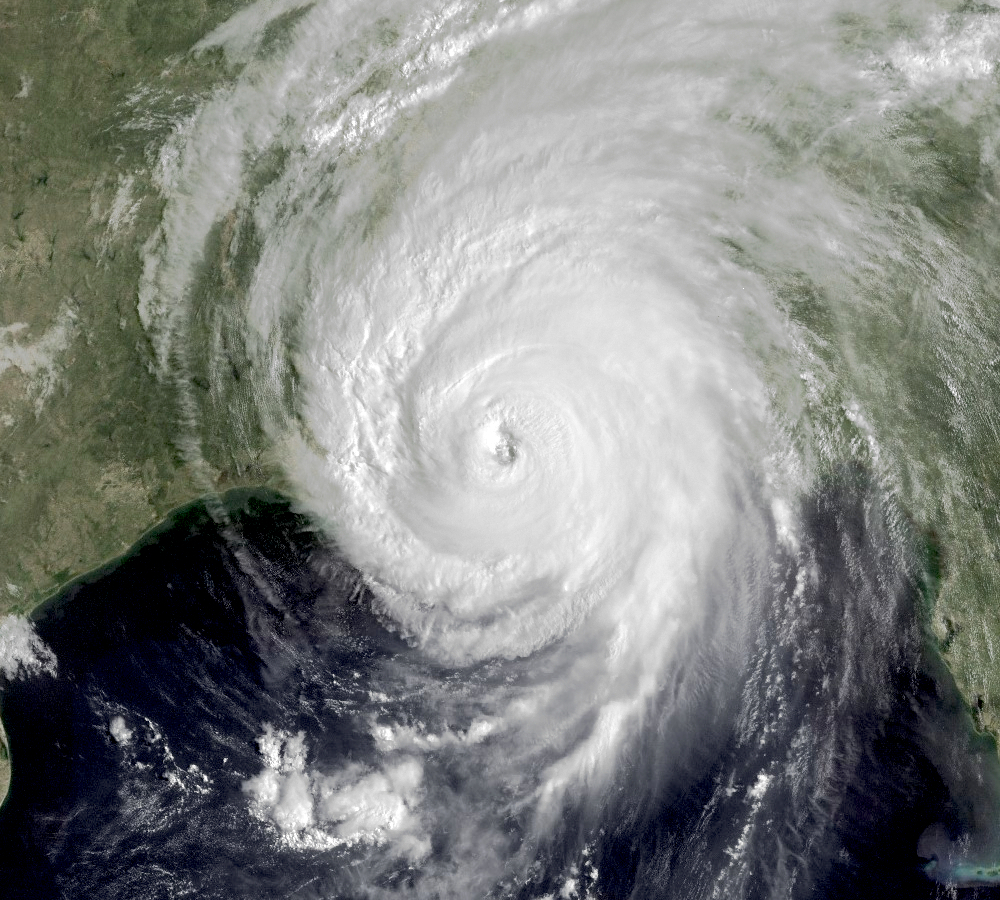
Hurricane Katrina making landfall in Mississippi

A Mississippi hurricane is a North Atlantic tropical cyclone that affected the U.S. state of Mississippi. From 1851 to the present, 108 tropical cyclones have passed through Mississippi. The costliest and deadliest hurricane in this period was Hurricane Katrina in 2005. Six hurricanes have made landfall as major hurricanes, (Note: A major hurricane is a tropical cyclone that ranks as a Category 3 or higher on the Saffir–Simpson scale.) the strongest of them being Hurricane Camille in 1969.

== Storms ==
=== Pre-1900 ===
- July 25, 1819: A hurricane made landfall near Bay St. Louis.
- September 15, 1821: A tropical cyclone struck Mississippi, causing at least 35 fatalities.
- October 5, 1837: Racer's hurricane caused damage in the state, destroying wharves along the coast.
- August 26, 1852: The Great Mobile hurricane made landfall in Pascagoula, Mississippi as a Category 3 hurricane. A wharf in the city was destroyed, killing at least four people. Several ships were washed ashore or blown out to sea with loss of life. Strong winds caused "considerable" destruction in Mississippi City and Biloxi.
- September 16, 1855: The Middle Gulf Shore hurricane made landfall in Mississippi as a Category 3.
- August 12, 1856: The 1856 Last Island hurricane moved into Mississippi as a tropical storm shortly before dissipating.
- August 12, 1860: A hurricane made landfall near Gulfport as a Category 3.
- September 15, 1860: A hurricane made landfall in Mississippi as a Category 2.
- October 2, 1860: A hurricane made landfall in Louisiana and entered Mississippi as a tropical storm.
- July 11, 1872: A tropical storm made landfall near Mississippi City.
- September 18, 1875: The 1875 Indianola hurricane reached Mississippi as a tropical depression before dissipating.
- September 1, 1879: The 1879 Louisiana hurricane moved through Mississippi as a tropical storm.
- October 7, 1879: A tropical storm made landfall near the Mississippi–Louisiana border.
- September 1, 1880: After making landfall in Florida, a tropical storm moved through Mississippi before dissipating.
- August 3, 1881: A tropical storm made landfall near the Alabama-Mississippi border.
- August 29, 1881: After making landfall in Georgia, the Georgia hurricane of 1881 entered Mississippi as a tropical storm.
- September 27, 1885: A tropical storm made landfall in Mississippi.
- June 15, 1886: A hurricane made landfall in Texas and moved through Mississippi as a tropical storm before dissipating.
- June 14, 1887: A minimal tropical storm made landfall in Mississippi.
- October 19, 1887: A tropical storm made landfall in Mississippi.
- August 19, 1888: The 1888 Louisiana hurricane brought hurricane-force winds to inland areas of Mississippi.
- August 28, 1890: A tropical storm moved through Mississippi after making landfall in Louisiana.
- July 7, 1891: A tropical depression moved through Mississippi after making landfall in Texas as a hurricane.
- September 12, 1892: A tropical storm moved through Mississippi after making landfall in Louisiana.
- September 8, 1893: A tropical storm moved through Mississippi after making landfall in Louisiana as a hurricane.
- October 3, 1893: After striking Louisiana as a Category 4, the 1893 Cheniere Caminada hurricane moved back over water and made landfall in Mississippi as a high-end Category 2. Heavy damage occurred in Pascagoula from wind and surge. The storm destroyed churches, houses, and mills all along the coast. The death toll in the Biloxi area was reported to be at least 100, with another 30 killed at Ship Island.
- August 8, 1894: A tropical storm moved through Mississippi after making landfall in Alabama.
- August 166, 1895: A tropical storm made landfall in Mississippi.

=== 1900s ===
- September 13, 1900: a tropical storm made landfall in Mississippi.
- August 15, 1901: After striking Louisiana as a Category 1, the 1901 Louisiana hurricane made landfall in Mississippi as a Category 1. The hurricane brought damage to much of the coastline, with damage in Biloxi alone estimated at $100,000. However, no loss of life was reported in Mississippi.
- September 29, 1905: A tropical storm moved through Mississippi after making landfall in Louisiana.
- September 27, 1906: The 1906 Mississippi hurricane made landfall in the state as a high-end Category 2.
- September 21, 1907: A tropical storm made landfall in Mississippi.
- August 3, 1908: A tropical storm made landfall in Louisiana then entered Mississippi as a tropical depression before dissipating.
- September 21, 1909: The 1909 Grand Isle hurricane, brought Category 2 conditions to Mississippi.
- August 12, 1911: A hurricane made landfall near the Alabama-Florida border then moved through southern Mississippi as a tropical storm.
- June 13, 1912: A tropical storm moved through Mississippi after making landfall in Louisiana.
- July 17, 1912: A tropical storm made landfall in Georgia and moved into Mississippi as a tropical depression before dissipating.
- September 14, 1912: A hurricane made landfall in Mississippi as a minimal category 1. However, the strongest winds were confined to areas east of the state in Alabama and Florida so hurricane conditions did not occur in the state.
- September 29, 1915: The 1915 New Orleans hurricane brought Category 2 conditions to Mississippi.
- July 15, 1916: The 1916 Gulf Coast hurricane made landfall in Mississippi as a Category 3.
- July 5, 1919: After making landfall in Florida as a tropical storm, a tropical depression entered Mississippi shortly before dissipating.
- June 26, 1923: A minimal tropical storm made landfall in Mississippi.
- October 15, 1923: A hurricane brought Category 1 winds to Mississippi while making landfall in Louisiana.
- October 18, 1923: A tropical storm made landfall in Mississippi.
- July 30, 1926: The 1926 Nassau hurricane moved through the state as a tropical depression after making landfall in Florida.
- September 21, 1926: After making landfall in Florida as a Category 4, the 1926 Miami hurricane struck the Gulf Coast as a Category 3, bringing Category 1 conditions to Mississippi.
- September 1–2, 1932: The 1932 Florida–Alabama hurricane passed through Mississippi as a tropical storm.
- September 20, 1932: A tropical storm made landfall in Louisiana and moved through Mississippi.
- June 16–17, 1934: The 1934 Central America hurricane moved through Mississippi as a tropical storm after making landfall in Louisiana. The storm brought heavy rainfall to parts of the state, exceeding 5 inches in multiple locations. There were 4 deaths recorded in association with the storm.
- July 28, 1936: A tropical storm made landfall in Louisiana and entered Mississippi as a tropical depression shortly before dissipating.
- September 1, 1937: A tropical storm made landfall in Florida then moved through Mississippi as a tropical depression.
- June 16–17, 1939: A tropical storm made landfall in Alabama and moved through Mississippi as a tropical depression.
- September 26, 1939: A tropical storm made landfall in Mississippi.
- September 25, 1940: A tropical storm made landfall in Louisiana and moved through Mississippi as a tropical depression before dissipating.
- September 6, 1945: A tropical depression made landfall in Mississippi.
- September 8, 1947: A tropical storm made landfall in Mississippi.
- September 19, 1947: After making landfall in Florida as a Category 4, the 1947 Fort Lauderdale hurricane brought Category 2 conditions to Mississippi while making landfall in Louisiana. 22 people were killed by the storm in Mississippi
- September 4–5, 1948: A tropical storm moved through Mississippi after making landfall as a hurricane in Louisiana.
- September 5, 1949: A tropical storm moved through Mississippi after making landfall in Louisiana.
- August 31, 1950: After making landfall in Alabama, Hurricane Baker moved over Mississippi as a tropical storm. Baker brought moderate rainfall to portions of Mississippi, peaking at 8.54 inches around Aberdeen.
- September 8, 1950: After making landfall in Florida, Hurricane Easy brought rainfall to Mississippi as a tropical depression, peaking at 2.68 inches near Columbus.
- June 14, 1956: An unnamed tropical storm passed through Mississippi, bringing rain that peaked at 8.65 inches in Wiggins.
- June 28, 1957: After making landfall in Louisiana, Hurricane Audrey passed through Mississippi as a tropical storm. Audrey brought strong winds to portions of Mississippi, with a peak gust of 60 mph (97 km/h) recorded near Vicksburg. Audrey also brought rainfall to much of the state, peaking at 6.34 inches near Liberty. At least four tornadoes occurred as well, the strongest of which being an F3 that caused one fatality.
- August 9–11, 1957: Though it did not pass through the state, Tropical Storm Bertha brought rain to extreme southwest and northwest Mississippi, with the highest total being 3.85 inches at Pearlington.
- September 19, 1957: Tropical Storm Esther moved through Mississippi as a tropical storm, bringing heavy rainfall peaking at 14.19 inches at Vancleave.
- May 31, 1959: Tropical Storm Arlene moved through Mississippi as a tropical depression, bringing heavy rainfall peaking at 13.55 inches in Merrill.
- June 1959: After making landfall in Texas, moisture from the eastern periphery of Hurricane Debra interacted with a frontal boundary causing heavy rainfall in Mississippi. Rainfall in the state peaked at 7.79 inches in Cleveland.
- October 8–9, 1959: While passing east of the state, Tropical Storm Irene brought rainfall to much of Mississippi, peaking at 6.21 inches at Ashland.
- June 24–29, 1960: An unnamed tropical storm brought light to moderate rainfall to the state, with rainfall peaking at 5.04 inches in Hernando.
- September 15, 1960: Hurricane Ethel made landfall in Mississippi as a Category 1.
- September 11, 1961: Hurricane Carla's large circulation brought heavy rain to south Mississippi, peaking at 6.37 inches near Brooklyn.
- October 4, 1964: After making landfall in Louisiana, Hurricane Hilda moved through Mississippi as a tropical storm. Hilda's winds caused significant crop damage in the state and heavy rainfall occurred peaking at 12.05 inches in McComb.
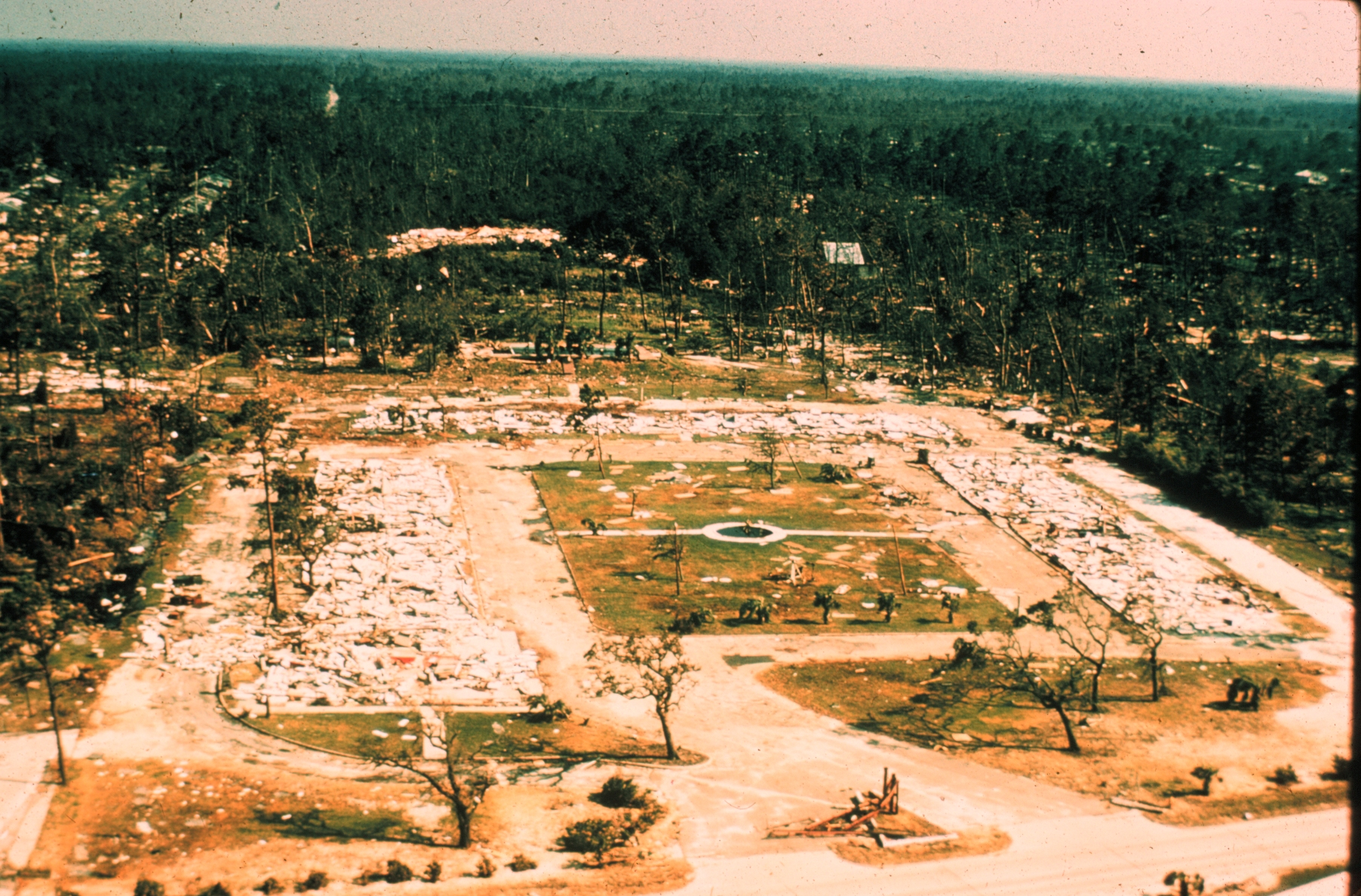
  Damage from Hurricane Camille in 1969
- June 15, 1965: An unnamed tropical storm brought rainfall to parts of Mississippi, peaking at 4.02 inches near Kipling.
- September 30, 1965: The remnants of Tropical Storm Debbie caused 4.52 inches of rain near Buckatunna.
- September 10, 1965: Hurricane Betsy brought tides of 7–10 feet across the Mississippi coast, as well as high winds and heavy rain. Damage throughout the state was estimated to be $80 million. Rainfall was heaviest in the easternmost portion of the state near the Louisiana border, peaking at 8.06 inches at the Jackson International Airport. One person was killed in the state in connection with the storm.
- August 18, 1969: Hurricane Camille made landfall near Bay St. Louis as a Category 5 with sustained winds estimated at 120 mph (190 km/h) and a central pressure of 900 mb. This made Camille the strongest hurricane to strike the state, and the second strongest to make landfall in the continental United States, behind the 1935 Labor Day hurricane. Camille brought a major storm surge to much of the coastline, peaking at 24.6 ft in Pass Christian. Further inland, Camille continued to produce hurricane-force winds with a fastest-mile wind of 120 mph (190 km/h) being recorded in Columbia before the instrument failed. Rainfall in the state peaked at 10.06 at the Mississippi Test Facility. Total damage in Mississippi was estimated at $950 million. (Note: All damage totals are in the value of the USD during the storm's year of existence.)
- October 1–2, 1969: A subtropical storm dropped 3.52 inches of rain near Fulton.
- July 22–23, 1970: Tropical Storm Becky brought rainfall to the state peaking at 7.08 inches at Shubuta.
- September 16–17, 1971: After making landfall in Louisiana, Hurricane Edith moved through Mississippi as a tropical storm. Edith brought moderate rainfall to much of the state, peaking at 7.05 inches at Rockport.
- September 5, 1971: A tropical depression that would eventually become Hurricane Fern moved inland near the Mississippi–Louisiana border before moving back out to sea. The depression brought rain to portions of the state, peaking at 3.76 inches at Vancleave.
- September 3–8, 1973: Tropical Storm Delia brought rainfall to the state while passing well-offshore. Rainfall peaked at 7.26 inches at Standard.
- September 8–9, 1974: Hurricane Carmen brought swaths of heavy rainfall to coastal portions of the state, peaking at 8.16 inches at Standard.
- July 29–30, 1974: A tropical depression brought rainfall to Mississippi, peaking at 9.61 inches near White Oak.
- September 23, 1975: Hurricane Eloise brought rainfall to eastern portions of the state, peaking at three inches near Pascagoula.
- October 16–17, 1975: A tropical depression brought rainfall to Mississippi, peaking at 8.88 inches in Madison County.
- September 6–7, 1977: Hurricane Babe moved through Mississippi as a tropical depression after making landfall in Louisiana. Rainfall from the storm peaked at 9.48 inches at Ackerman.
- August 27–28, 1978: Tropical Storm Debra brought rainfall to Mississippi while passing west of the state, peaking at 7.79 inches near Cleveland. One person was killed in Turkey Creek by an estimated F1 tornado.
- July 11–12, 1979: Hurricane Bob moved through Mississippi as a tropical storm after making landfall as a hurricane in Louisiana. Rainfall peaked at 6.64 inches near Pascagoula.
- September 13, 1979: Hurricane Frederic moved through Mississippi after making landfall in Alabama. While storm surge was limited by the hurricane's eye passing to the east, wind damage was severe throughout much of eastern Mississippi. In Pascagoula, the winds unroofed buildings, uprooted trees, and shattered windows throughout the city. Further inland, winds destroyed mobile homes and blew down power poles all along the eastern border of the state, leaving many without power. Frederic also brought heavy rain to the coast, peaking at 11 inches in Pascagoula. Damage was estimated to be in excess of $50 million.
- July 20, 1980: A tropical depression made landfall in Mississippi.
- September 4–6, 1980: Tropical Storm Danielle brought rainfall to the state while moving well offshore, peaking at 3.14 inches near Bay St. Louis.
- September 11–14, 1982: Tropical Storm Chris brought heavy rainfall to the state, peaking at 11.30 inches at Moorhead.
- August 16–17, 1985: Hurricane Danny moved through Mississippi as a tropical depression after making landfall in Louisiana. Rainfall peaked at 8.48 inches at Wiggins.
- September 2, 1985: Hurricane Elena made landfall near Gulfport as a Category 3, causing significant wind damage to much of the coast. Multiple locations reported gusts above 100 mph (160 km/h), the strongest being a gust to 121 mph (195 km/h) in Gulfport. Rainfall in the state peaked at 6.8 inches at Picayune.
- October 29–31, 1985: Hurricane Juan brought heavy rains to the state while looping near the coast of Louisiana. Rainfall peaked at 10.52 inches at Biloxi.
- June 26–30, 1986: Hurricane Bonnie's mid-level circulation separated from its surface circulation and moved through Mississippi, bringing rainfall that peaked at 5.1 inches near Lambert.
- October 22–26, 1986: Hurricane Roslyn's remnants brought rain to much of Mississippi, peaking at 5.07 inches near Vaiden.
- August 11–13, 1987: The 1987 Gulf Coast tropical storm moved through Mississippi as a tropical depression, bringing heavy rain to southern portions of the state. Rainfall peaked at 21.06 inches at Vancleave.
- August 4–12, 1988: Tropical Storm Beryl brought heavy rainfall to southern Mississippi, peaking at 10.8 inches near Pascagoula.
- September 10, 1988: Hurricane Florence moved through the state as a tropical depression, causing heavy rains in Mississippi. Rainfall peaked at 8.35 inches at Liberty.
- June 26-July 2, 1989: Tropical Storm Allison brought heavy rainfall to the state, peaking at 11.58 inches near Woodville.
- August 26–27, 1992: Hurricane Andrew moved through the state as a tropical storm. Andrew brought heavy rain to the state, peaking at 9.3 inches at Sumrall.
- June 20–23, 1993: Tropical Storm Arlene brought rainfall to the state, peaking at 6.5 inches at Leakseville.
- July 3–8, 1994: Tropical Storm Alberto (1994) brought heavy rainfall to the state, peaking at 6.99 inches at Vancleave.
- July 28-August 24, 1995: Tropical Storm Dean brought rainfall to the state while passing far offshore, peaking at 5.84 inches at Waveland.
- August 4–5, 1995: Hurricane Erin moved through the state as a tropical storm after making landfall as a hurricane in Florida. Rainfall peaked at 9.65 inches near Philadelphia. Insured damage in the state was estimated at $5 million
- October 4–5, 1995: Hurricane Opal brought rainfall to Mississippi while moving through Florida and Alabama, peaking at 5.9 inches at Vancleave.
- September 28, 1998: Hurricane Georges made landfall near Biloxi as a Category 2. Georges brought high winds, storm surge, and heavy rainfall to southern Mississippi while looping over the state. Surge in Mississippi peaked at 8.9 feet at Biloxi, bringing heavy damage to the coast. Georges brought over 10 inches of rain to a large swath of southern Mississippi, peaking at 32.21 inches at Wiggins. This was the highest tropical cyclone rainfall total in the state. Damage in the state was estimated at $665 million.

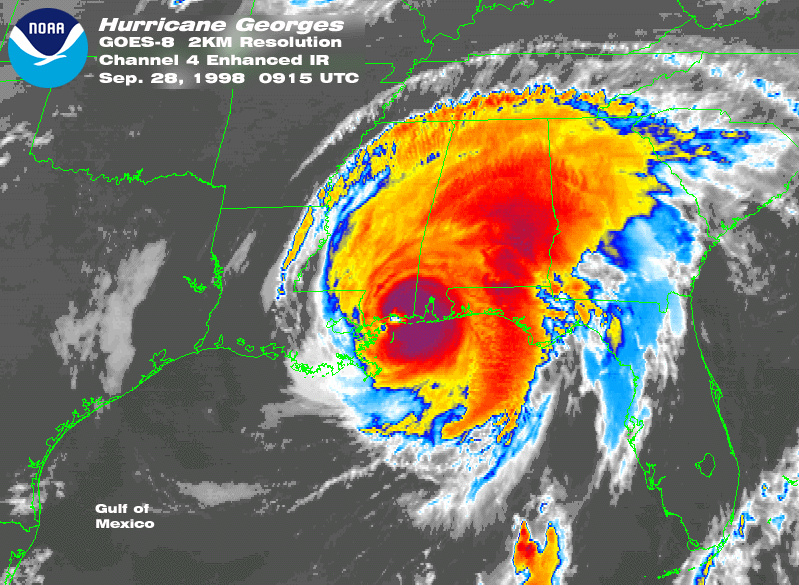
Infrared image of Hurricane Georges making landfall in Mississippi in 1998

=== 2000s ===
- June 11–12, 2001: Tropical Storm Allison moved through Mississippi bringing heavy rainfall and four tornadoes. One person was killed in the state. Rainfall peaked at 18.95 inches near Liberty.
- August 6–7, 2001: Tropical Storm Barry moved through the state as a tropical depression after making landfall in Florida. Rainfall peaked at 3.86 inches near Van Vleet.
- September 14, 2002: Tropical Storm Hanna made landfall near the Mississippi-Florida border. Rainfall in the state peaked at 3.03 inches at Wiggins.
- September 26–27, 2002: Hurricane Isidore moved through the state as a tropical storm after making landfall in Louisiana.
- July 1, 2003: Tropical Storm Bill moved through Mississippi after making landfall in Louisiana. Rainfall peaked at 8.85 inches at Pascagoula.
- July 6, 2005: Hurricane Cindy moved through the state as a tropical storm after making landfall as a hurricane in Louisiana. Rainfall peaked at 7.39 inches at Waveland.
- July 11, 2005: Hurricane Dennis moved through the state as a tropical depression.
- August 29, 2005: Hurricane Katrina made landfall in Mississippi as a Category 3, causing widespread devastation. Katrina produced exceptional storm surge along the coast, peaking at 28 feet at Pass Christian and penetrating as far inland as six miles in some locations. Hurricane-force winds were felt from the Mississippi–Louisiana border to as far east as Pascagoula. Substantial wind damage occurred inland, with hurricane-force gusts penetrating as far north as Meridian. The highest reported gust was 135 mph at Poplarville. 11 tornadoes were reported in the state in association with Katrina. At least 238 people were killed in Mississippi from the storm, with another 67 reported missing.
- September 14, 2007: Hurricane Humberto entered Mississippi as a tropical depression and dissipated shortly afterward. Rainfall peaked at 6.11 inches at Eupora.
- August 24–25, 2008: Tropical Storm Fay moved through Mississippi as a tropical depression. Rainfall peaked at seven inches near Ackerman.
- September 1–3, 2008: Hurricane Gustav brought heavy rain, strong winds, and storm surge while moving west of the state after making landfall in Louisiana. Heavy rain was widespread through eastern portions of the state, peaking at 14.33 inches near Bude. In addition to strong winds at the coast, 21 tornadoes were reported in connection with Gustav. The highest storm surge level recorded in the state was 9.89 feet.
- August 13–17, 2010: A tropical depression made landfall in Mississippi, moved back over water, and made landfall in the state again. The depression brought heavy rainfall to parts of the state, peaking at 13.9 inches near Natchez.
- August 31, 2017: After making its final landfall in Louisiana, Hurricane Harvey moved through Mississippi as a tropical depression before becoming extratropical. Rainfall in the state peaked at 8.06 inches near Gautier.
- September 12, 2017: Hurricane Irma entered the state as a tropical depression. Rainfall in the state peaked at 2.02 inches near Independence.
- October 8, 2017: Hurricane Nate made landfall in near Biloxi as a minimal hurricane. The storm brought storm surge of 5–6 feet along the coast and spawned 1 tornado. Rainfall peaked at 5.99 inches near Ocean Springs.
- September 5–6, 2018: Tropical Storm Gordon made landfall in the state as a strong tropical storm. Gordon brought heavy rainfall to eastern portions of the state, peaking at 10.15 near Brandon. One tornado, rated EF0, was reported near Kilmichael.
- June 8, 2020: Tropical storm Cristobal moved through the state after making landfall in Louisiana. Rainfall in the state peaked at 13.65 inches near Caesar. Damage in the state was estimated at $5.7 million.
- September 24, 2020: The extratropical remnants of Tropical Storm Beta moved through the state, bringing gusty winds and rainfall. Rainfall in the state peaked at 10.05 inches at Rosetta.
- October 10, 2020: After making landfall in Louisiana, Hurricane Delta entered the state as a tropical storm and become extratropical shortly afterward. Rainfall in the state peaked at 7.87 inches near Eudora. One tornado, rated EF0, was reported in the state.
- October 29, 2020: Hurricane Zeta moved through Mississippi as a Category 2 after making landfall in Louisiana as a Category 3. The strongest recorded sustained winds were 85 mph (137 km/h) near Gulfport, with stronger winds likely occurring further west in the state. Rainfall peaked at 6.87 inches near Leakesville. One tornado, rated EF1, was reported in the state. The storm produced storm surge of 6–10 feet along the coast, killing one person in Biloxi. Damage in the state was estimated at $635 million.
- June 19, 2021: Tropical Storm Claudette moved through the state, bringing tropical-storm force winds to the coast and beach erosion from heavy surf. Claudette spawned four tornadoes in the state, the strongest being an EF1. Rainfall in the state peaked at 15.28 inches near Gulfport.
- August 30–31, 2021: After making landfall in Louisiana as a Category 4, Hurricane Ida moved through Mississippi as a tropical storm. The storm brought tropical-storm force wind gusts to much of the state, the highest recorded being 74 mph (119 km/h) at Gulfport. Heavy rainfall occurred as well, peaking at 13.65 inches near Kiln. Two people in the state were killed from freshwater flooding in George County.
- September 11-12, 2024: Hurricane Francine crossed into Mississippi as a tropical depression after making landfall in Louisiana as a Category 2 hurricane.

== Listed by month ==
Mississippi hurricanes by month
Month	Number of storms
May	1
June	12
July	13
August	26
September	44
October	14

== Major hurricanes ==
Major Hurricanes in Mississippi
Storm	Date of Landall	Intensity	Landfall Location
"Great Mobile"	August 26, 1852	100 kts	Pascagoula
"Middle Gulf Shore"	September 16, 1855	100 kts	Waveland
Hurricane Four	August 11, 1860	100 kts	Gulfport
Hurricane Two	July 5, 1916	105 kts	Grand Bay, Alabama‡
Camille	August 26, 1969	150 kts	Waveland
Frederic	September 13, 1979	115 kts†	Bayou la Batre, Alabama‡
Elena	September 2, 1985	100 kts	Gulfport
Katrina	August 29, 2005	105 kts	Jackson Landing
†Best track data for storms between 1971 and 1979 does not currently include non-synoptic points to indicate the storm's strength at landfall. The last synoptic point before landfall is used in this case instead.
‡Storm did not make landfall in Mississippi, but brought major hurricane winds to the state.

== Deadly storms ==
The following is a list of tropical cyclones with known deaths in the state.

Name	Year	Number of Deaths	Notes
Katrina	2005	238+	
Camille	1969	137	
"Cheniere Caminada"	1893	130	
"1906 Mississippi"	1906	78	
Unnamed	1821	35	
"Fort Lauderdale"	1947	22	
"Great Mobile"	1852	4+	
"1934 Central America"	1934	4	
Isidore	2002	3	
Isaac	2012	2	
Ida	2021	2	
Audrey	1957	1	
Betsy	1965	1	
Debra	1978	1	
Allison	2001	1	
Lee	2011	1	
Zeta	2020	1	

== See also ==
- List of United States hurricanes
