= Hurricane Sally =

Category 2 Atlantic hurricane in 2020

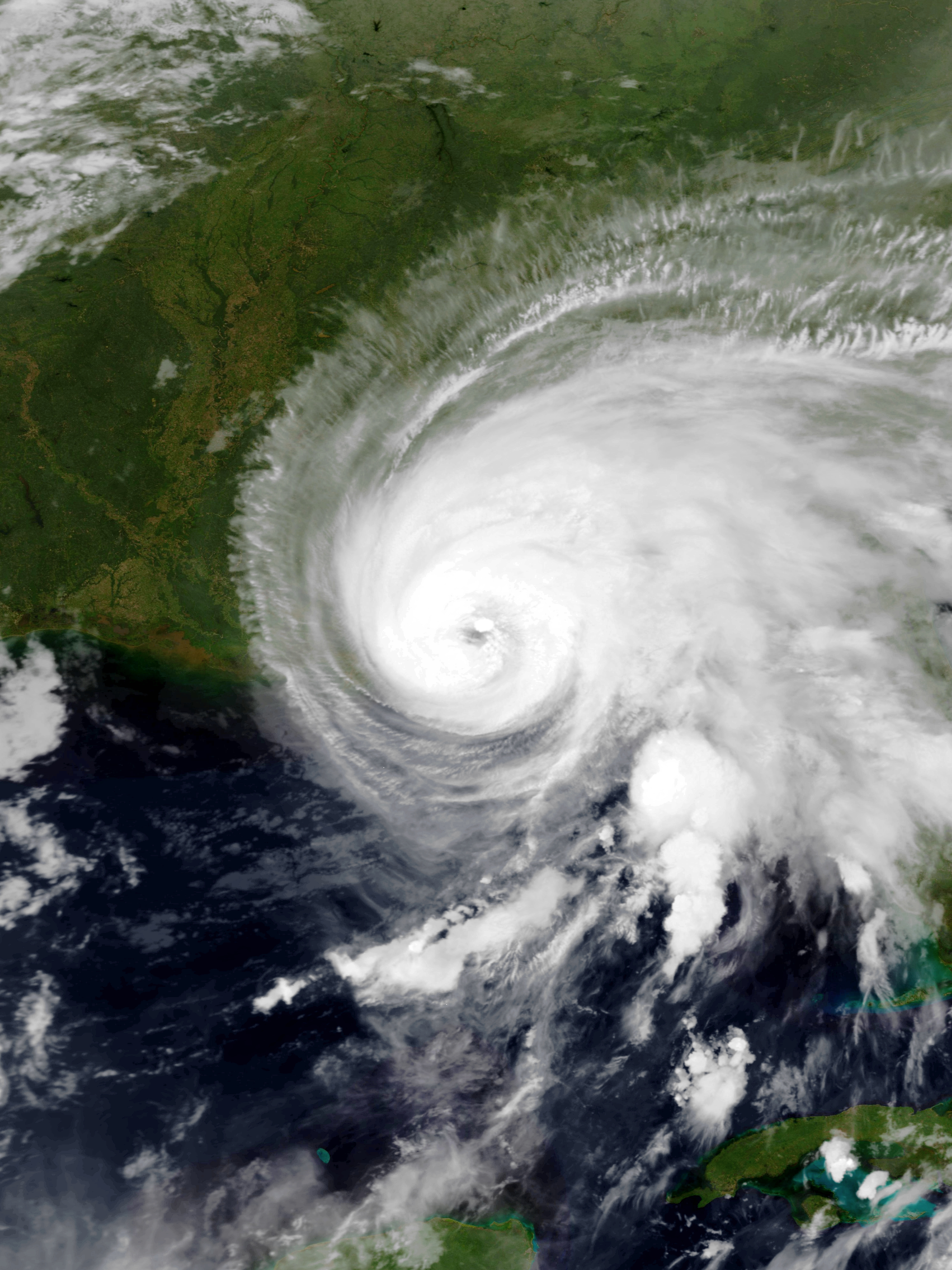
- Hurricane Sally rapidly intensifying before landfall in Alabama on September 16

Meteorological history
- Formed: September 11, 2020
- Extratropical: September 17, 2020
- Dissipated: September 18, 2020

Category 2 hurricane
- 1-minute sustained (SSHWS/NWS)
- Highest winds: 110 mph (175 km/h)
- Lowest pressure: 965 mbar (hPa); 28.50 inHg

Overall effects
- Fatalities: 9 (4 direct, 5 indirect)
- Damage: $7.3 billion (2020 USD)
- Areas affected: The Bahamas, Cuba, U.S. Gulf Coast, Southeastern United States
- IBTrACS
- Part of the 2020 Atlantic hurricane season

Hurricane Sally was a destructive and slow-moving tropical cyclone that was the first hurricane to make landfall in the U.S. state of Alabama since Ivan in 2004, coincidentally on the same date in the same place. The eighteenth named storm and seventh hurricane of the extremely active 2020 Atlantic hurricane season, Sally developed from an area of disturbed weather which was first monitored over the Bahamas on September 10. The system grew a broad area of low-pressure on September 11, and was designated as a tropical depression late that day. Early the next day, the depression made landfall at Key Biscayne and subsequently strengthened into Tropical Storm Sally that afternoon. Moderate northwesterly shear prevented significant intensification for the first two days, but convection continued to grow towards the center and Sally slowly intensified. On September 14, a center reformation into the center of the convection occurred, and data from a hurricane hunter reconnaissance aircraft showed that Sally had rapidly intensified into a strong Category 1 hurricane. However, an increase in wind shear and upwelling of colder waters halted the intensification and Sally weakened slightly on September 15 before turning slowly northeastward. Despite this increase in wind shear, it unexpectedly re-intensified, reaching Category 2 status early on September 16 before making landfall at peak intensity at 09:45 UTC on September 16, near Gulf Shores, Alabama, with maximum sustained winds of 110 mph (180 km/h) and a minimum central pressure of 965 millibars (28.5 inHg). The storm rapidly weakened after landfall before transitioning into an extratropical low at 12:00 UTC the next day. Sally's remnants lasted for another day as they moved off the coast of the Southeastern United States before being absorbed into another extratropical storm on September 18.

Numerous watches and warnings were issued in anticipation of the imminent approach of Sally, and several coastline counties and parishes on the Gulf Coast were evacuated. In South Florida, heavy rain led to localized flash flooding while the rest of peninsula saw continuous shower and thunderstorm activity due to the asymmetric structure of Sally. The area between Mobile, Alabama, and Pensacola–Gulf Breeze, Florida took the brunt of the storm with widespread wind damage, storm surge flooding, and over 20 inches (510 mm) of rainfall in the first 24 hours and over 30 inches in 48 hours. Numerous tornadoes also occurred as well. Damage is estimated at $7.3 billion (2020 USD). Sally was the costliest of several destructive 2020 hurricanes whose names were not retired by the World Meteorological Organization following the season.

== Meteorological history ==
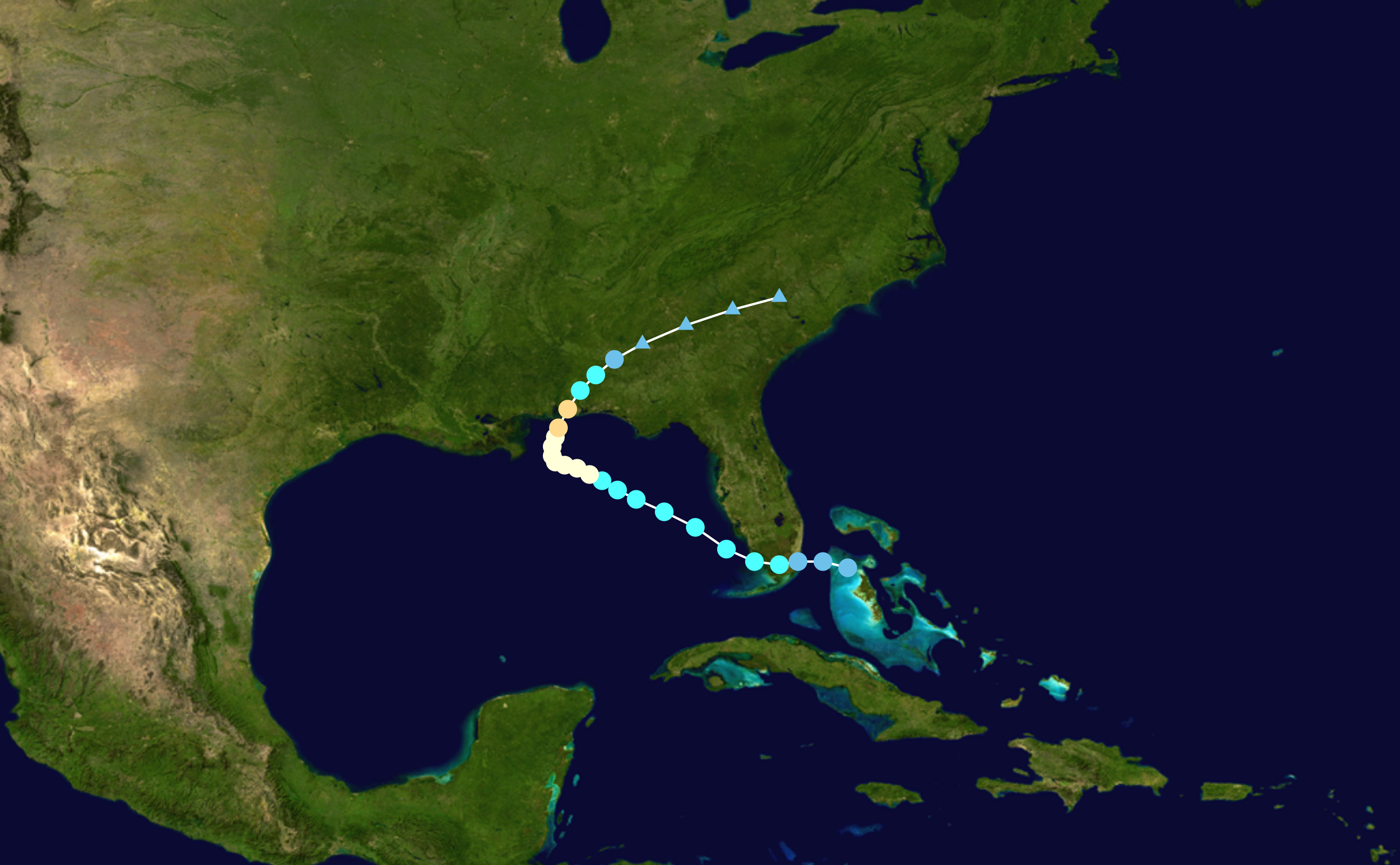
Map plotting the storm's track and intensity, according to the Saffir–Simpson scale Map key Saffir–Simpson scale Tropical depression (≤38 mph, ≤62 km/h) Tropical storm (39–73 mph, 63–118 km/h) Category 1 (74–95 mph, 119–153 km/h) Category 2 (96–110 mph, 154–177 km/h) Category 3 (111–129 mph, 178–208 km/h) Category 4 (130–156 mph, 209–251 km/h) Category 5 (≥157 mph, ≥252 km/h) Unknown Storm type Tropical cyclone Subtropical cyclone Extratropical cyclone, remnant low, tropical disturbance, or monsoon depression

Toward the end of August 2020, a shortwave trough interacted with a decaying frontal boundary and led to the development of Tropical Storm Omar. This weak tropical cyclone later became embedded within a broad mid-level trough well to the north of Bermuda as it dissipated on September 5; an extension of this trough propagated southwest as Omar moved over the North Atlantic. Over the next five days, the system remained disorganized as it approached the Bahamas. The National Hurricane Center (NHC) first noted the potential for tropical cyclogenesis on September 9, anticipating the system to not become a tropical cyclone until reaching the Gulf of Mexico several days later. A broad surface low steadily coalesced with accompanying convection becoming more organized as the system approached the archipelago on September 11. Contrary to the NHC's forecasts, the system developed into a tropical depression, the nineteenth of the season, by 18:00 UTC that day while situated between Andros Island and Bimini in the Bahamas, or about 115 mi (185 km/h) east-southeast of Miami, Florida. A subtropical ridge over the Southeastern United States steered the system generally west-northwest toward the Florida Peninsula. Around 06:00 UTC on September 12, the depression made landfall near Cutler Bay, Florida, with maximum sustained winds of 35 mph (55 km/h). Within hours, multiple weather stations began recording sustained tropical storm-force winds and the system became Tropical Storm Sally by 12:00 UTC while situated over the Everglades. This marked the earliest formation of a season's 18th named storm, surpassing the previous record of October 2 set in 2005 with Hurricane Stan.

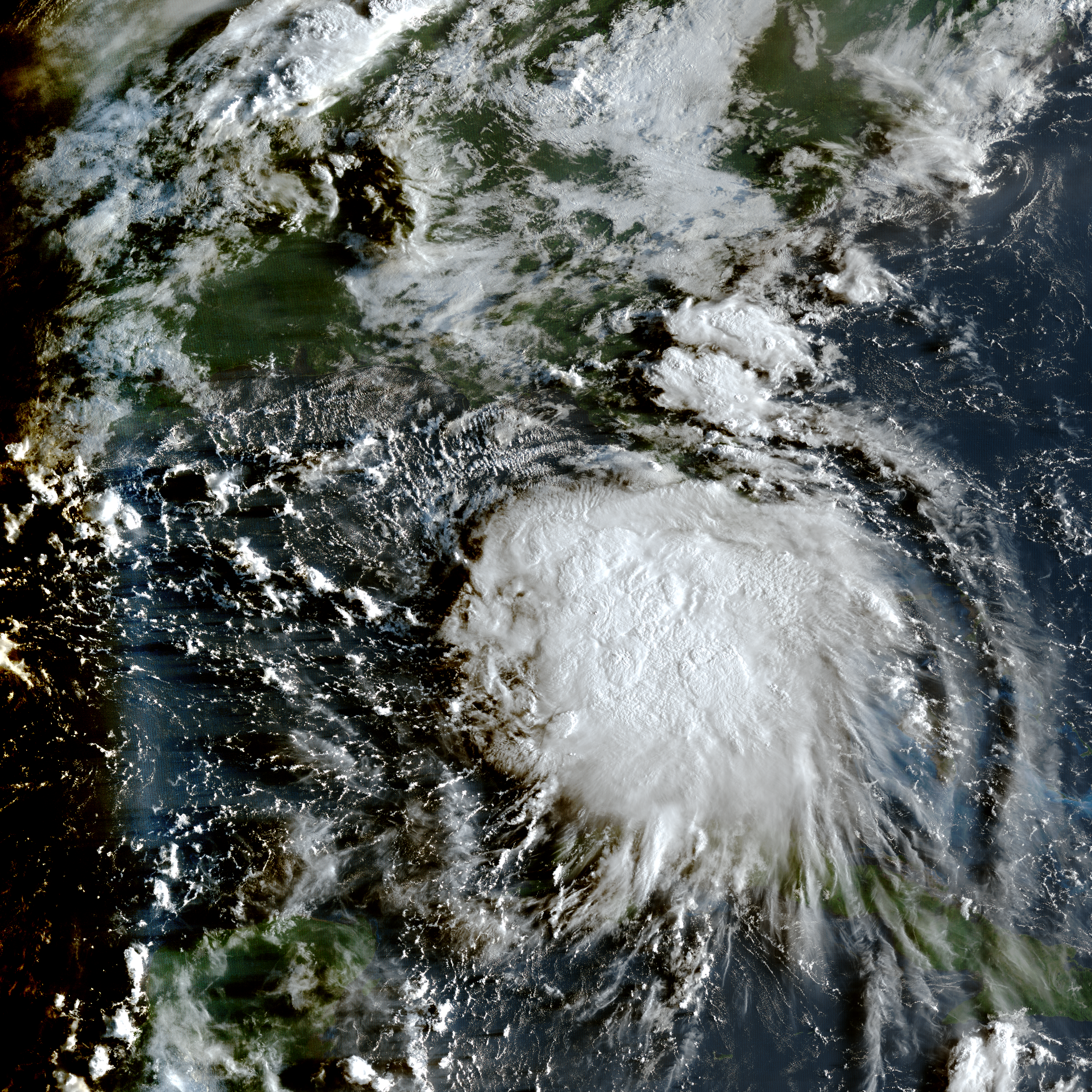
Tropical Storm Sally organizing over the southeastern Gulf of Mexico on September 13

As Sally emerged over the eastern Gulf of Mexico later on September 12, banding features became increasingly defined over the southern portion of its circulation. One of these bands became somewhat stationary, pivoting over the Florida Keys and Florida Bay while producing heavy rainfall in the region. As Sally rounded the southern edge of the ridge and turned west-northwest, modest wind shear inhibited significant intensification over the next day. A prominent central dense overcast, displaced about 50–60 mi (85–95 km) from the circulation center, blossomed early on September 13. A convergence zone along the backside of the storm became established over the Florida Peninsula within an environment highly favoring extreme rainfall rates. A temporary reprieve in wind shear enabled Sally's core to become more vertically aligned and convective bursts occurred throughout the day into September 14. Following a burst of deep convection with tops colder than −112 °F (−80 °C), Sally underwent a brief period of rapid intensification. Its winds increased to 85 mph (140 km/h) by 18:00 UTC at the end of this phase, constituting its initial peak intensity. Nearby land-based Doppler weather radar depicted a developing mid- to upper-level eye within the hurricane's core at this time. The northern outer bands of the hurricane began impacting the Florida Panhandle early on September 14, primarily along the coast of Apalachee Bay. Rainfall continued to spread west into Alabama and slightly inland and its persistence led to soil saturation of 85 percent well-before the storm's core arrived. Operationally, the NHC upgraded the storm to low-end Category 2 status at 21:00 UTC, but this was determined to be due to transient eyewall features and not a true estimate of the storm's intensity.

By the start of September 15, steering currents collapsed and Sally largely stalled south of the Florida Panhandle and Mobile Bay with a slight drift west. A sudden increase in wind shear caused the hurricane's structure to degrade, with its core becoming asymmetric. An intrusion of dry air caused the eye to open up to the south. The hurricane's forward motion gradually shifted to the north and later north-northeast throughout the day as it approached the northwest side of a weak ridge. Although wind shear did not abate, upper-level divergence increased significantly and enabled the hurricane to unexpectedly intensify as it approached the Alabama coastline. Its eye became increasingly well-defined and aircraft observations revealed a major increase in both flight-level and surface winds; elevated winds up to 131 mph (211 km/h) were detected by Doppler weather radar. Convection around the core and in rainbands east of the center became more intense during this period. "Significant and life threatening flash flooding" began late on September 15 as rainfall intensified to rates up 3 in (76 mm) per hour along the coast, primarily between Gulf Shores, Alabama, and Destin, Florida. The Weather Prediction Center soon described it as "catastrophic flash flooding" as accumulations exceeded 18 in (460 mm) within 24 hours with rainfall rates up to 4 in (100 mm) per hour still occurring. Additional rainbands developed farther east near Panama City and Apalachicola, expanding the scope of the flood event.

Radar animation of Hurricane Sally on September 16–17 as it made landfall and moved across the Southeastern United States

Sally's northern eyewall began moving onshore in Baldwin County, Alabama, between Mobile Bay and Pensacola Bay around 05:00 UTC. Mesovortices within the eyewall battered the coastline with violent wind gusts during this time. The storm reached Category 2 intensity by 06:00 UTC as it approached Mobile Bay and continued to intensify until its center reached land. The hurricane ultimately made landfall at peak strength in Gulf Shores at 09:45 UTC with maximum sustained winds of 110 mph (175 km/h) and a minimum pressure of 965 mbar (hPa; 28.49 inHg). This coincidentally occurred on the 16th anniversary of Hurricane Ivan's landfall in the same location and just three hours later. Ingram Bayou saw the most intense winds, with sustained values reaching 113 mph (182 km/h) and a peak gust of 137 mph (220 km/h). These were observed atop an 59 ft (18 m) mast and were not representative of surface values.

Hurricane Sally's structure rapidly degraded as it progressed farther inland throughout September 16. Briefly crossing the border into the Florida Panhandle, the hurricane weakened to a tropical storm by 18:00 UTC as it moved back over southeastern Alabama. During this time, its forward motion steadily increased as it interacted with the mid-latitude westerlies. Convection surrounding the center eroded amid increasing wind shear and the influence of land-based friction. Excellent outflow aloft supported continued heavy rain across central Georgia in areas northeast of the center. Moist southerly flow from Sally interacted with a developing frontal boundary over the state and expanded the breadth of heavy rain. Sally degraded to a tropical depression by 06:00 UTC on September 17 as its surface circulation decoupled from its mid- to upper-level circulation, with the latter accelerating ahead. The system transitioned into post-tropical cyclone soon after as it merged with a frontal boundary over Georgia six hours later, and a defined warm front became established to the east-northeast. The trailing surface circulation of Sally continued to weaken before dissipating over South Carolina on September 18. A new low-pressure area developed over eastern North Carolina later that day in association with the aforementioned front and Sally's remnants. A convergence zone developed across northern North Carolina into southeastern Virginia as warm, moist air from the remnant system interacted with an unseasonably strong cold front, creating an axis of heavy rain across the region. The rain event associated with Sally finally ceased late on September 18 as the new system moved farther offshore.

== Preparations ==
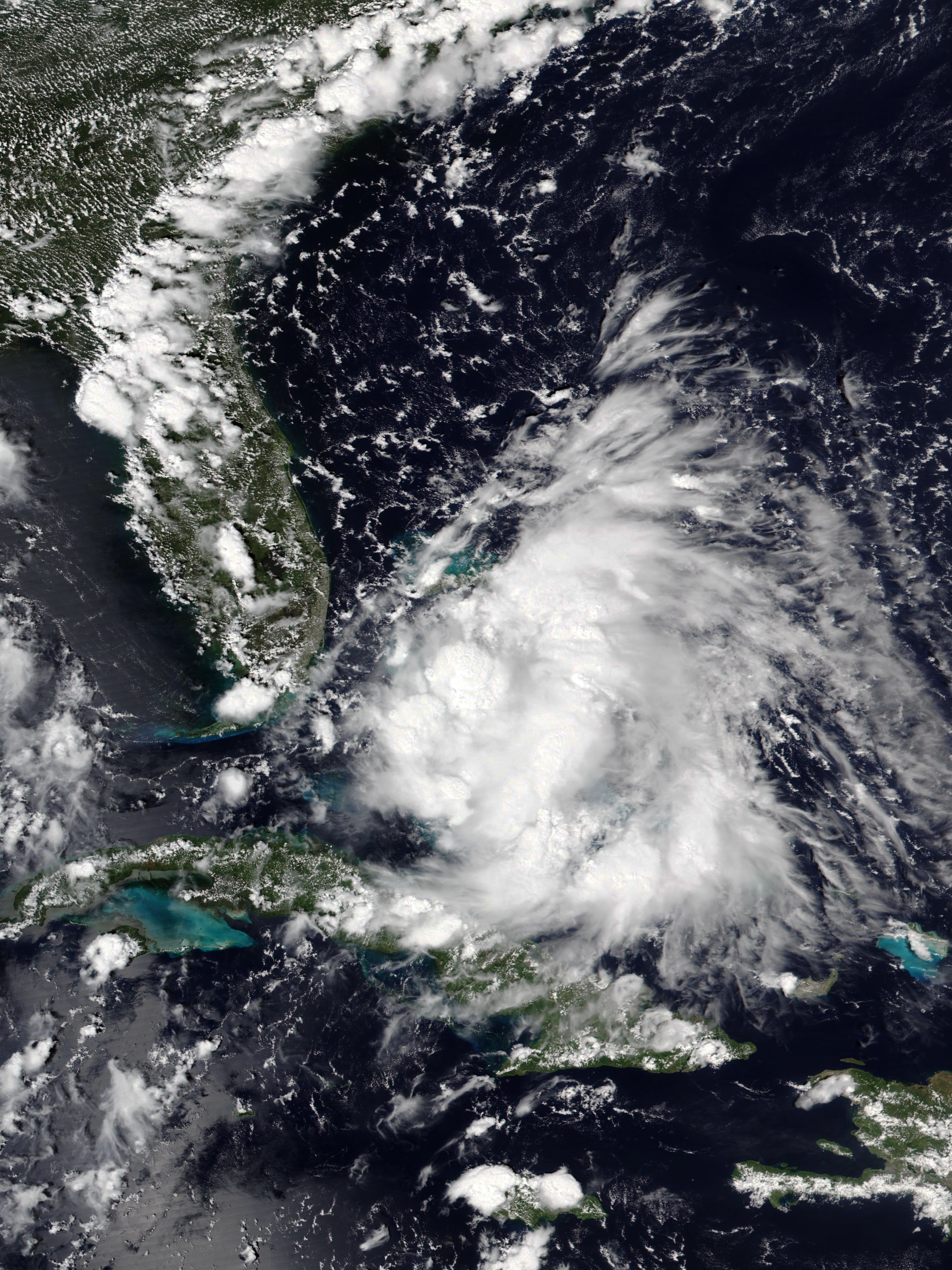
Tropical Depression Nineteen shortly after formation on September 11

Due to the possibility of the storm making landfall as a tropical storm, a tropical storm watch was issued for the coast of Southeastern Florida from south of Jupiter Inlet to north of Ocean Reef when advisories were first issued at 21:00 UTC on September 11. At 03:00 UTC on September 12, another tropical storm watch was issued for the Florida panhandle from the Ochlockonee River to the Okaloosa/Walton County line. That same day, numerous storm surge, tropical storm, and hurricane watches were then issued for a large portion of the US Gulf Coast east of New Orleans at 21:00 UTC, three hours after Sally was named. Many of these watches were then upgraded to warnings at 09:00 UTC on September 13 with more watches and warnings issued in the hours that followed. Several tornado, flash flood, and flood watches were issued.

States of emergency were declared in the states of Louisiana, Mississippi, and Alabama in preparation for Sally's arrival. Emergencies were also declared in the East Baton Rouge and St. Bernard parishes in Louisiana and Escambia, Santa Rosa and Okaloosa counties in Florida as well as New Orleans and Pensacola, Florida. The National Park Service shut down the entirety of Gulf Islands National Seashore on September 12.

=== Louisiana ===
The mayor of New Orleans, LaToya Cantrell, issued an evacuation for areas outside the levee system of the city, due to expected storm surge. The governor of Louisiana declared a state of emergency for the entire state, which was still recovering from the devastating effects of Hurricane Laura just three weeks earlier. Several parishes and areas were put under mandatory evacuation orders including all of St. Charles Parish, and parts of Orleans Parish, Jefferson Parish, Plaquemines Parish, and St. John the Baptist Parish. Shelters were opened while public school and university classes were canceled throughout southeastern Louisiana for September 15. FEMA declared that they will be bringing additional resources to Louisiana for the storm's aftermath and not diverting resources away from Hurricane Laura's relief efforts. Lakeshore Drive along Lake Pontchartrain was closed before the storm as well.

=== Mississippi ===
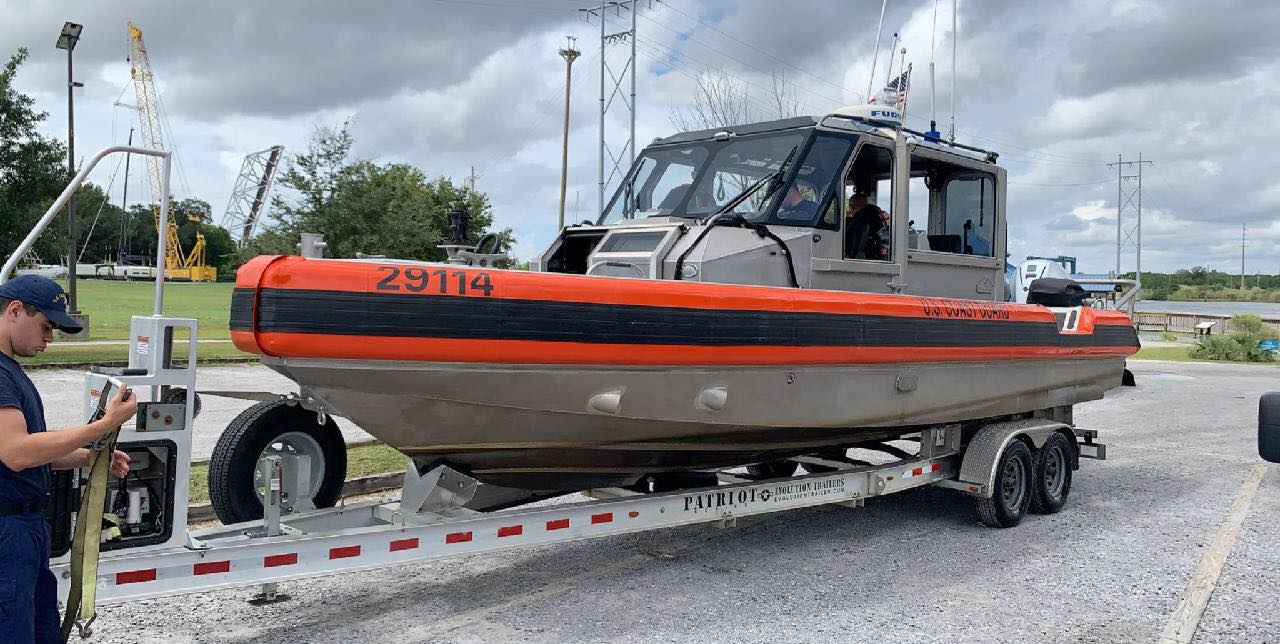
The U.S. Coast Guard was involved in rescue operations

A state of emergency was declared on the night of Sunday, September 13, 2020. Mississippi governor Tate Reeves urged residents to prepare for Sally, which he said could produce up to 20 inches (510 mm) of rain in the southern part of the state. Some shelters were opened, although officials urged people who were evacuating to stay with friends, relatives, or in hotels, if possible, because of the threat of coronavirus superspreading. Mandatory evacuations were ordered for parts of Harrison County and Hancock County.

=== Alabama ===
Alabama governor Kay Ivey closed all beaches on the coast and called for evacuations of low-lying and flood prone areas. Additionally, Dauphin Island mayor Jeff Collier strongly encouraged all people to evacuate the west end after water started to encroach on the main roadway. A state of emergency was declared by governor Kay Ivey on September 14, 2020, as public schools and university classes were either canceled or moved online in anticipation of the storm.

=== Florida ===
On September 14 at 6:00pm, the Pensacola International Airport closed.

== Impact ==
Radar images of both of Sally's landfalls. The first shows it landfall as Tropical Depression Nineteen near Miami, Florida on September 12 while the second shows Sally shortly after landfall in Gulf Shores, Alabama on September 16.

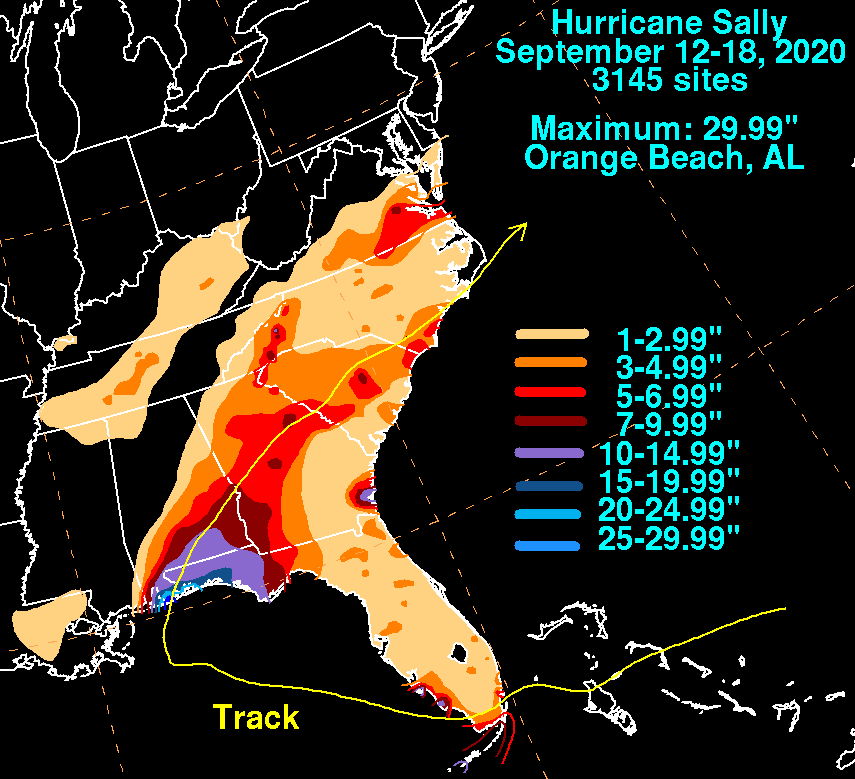
A summary map of rainfall associated with Hurricane Sally

Warm and humid southerly flow associated with the circulation of Sally brought scattered showers and thunderstorms to western and central areas of Cuba on September 12–13.

The re-intensification and sudden track to the east by Sally prior to landfall caught many by surprise. Additionally, the storm's slow movement caused coastal areas between Mobile, Alabama, and Pensacola, Florida, to be in the northern eyewall for hours. Over 500,000 customers in Louisiana, Alabama, Florida, and Georgia lost power and parts of I-10, including the Escambia Bay Bridge, were shut down. Widespread tornado, special marine, severe thunderstorm, and flash flood warnings were issued, including several flash flood emergencies. Sally was the most destructive storm to strike the Alabama–Florida border region in nearly 20 years, which included Baldwin County in Alabama and Escambia County in Florida.

=== Florida ===
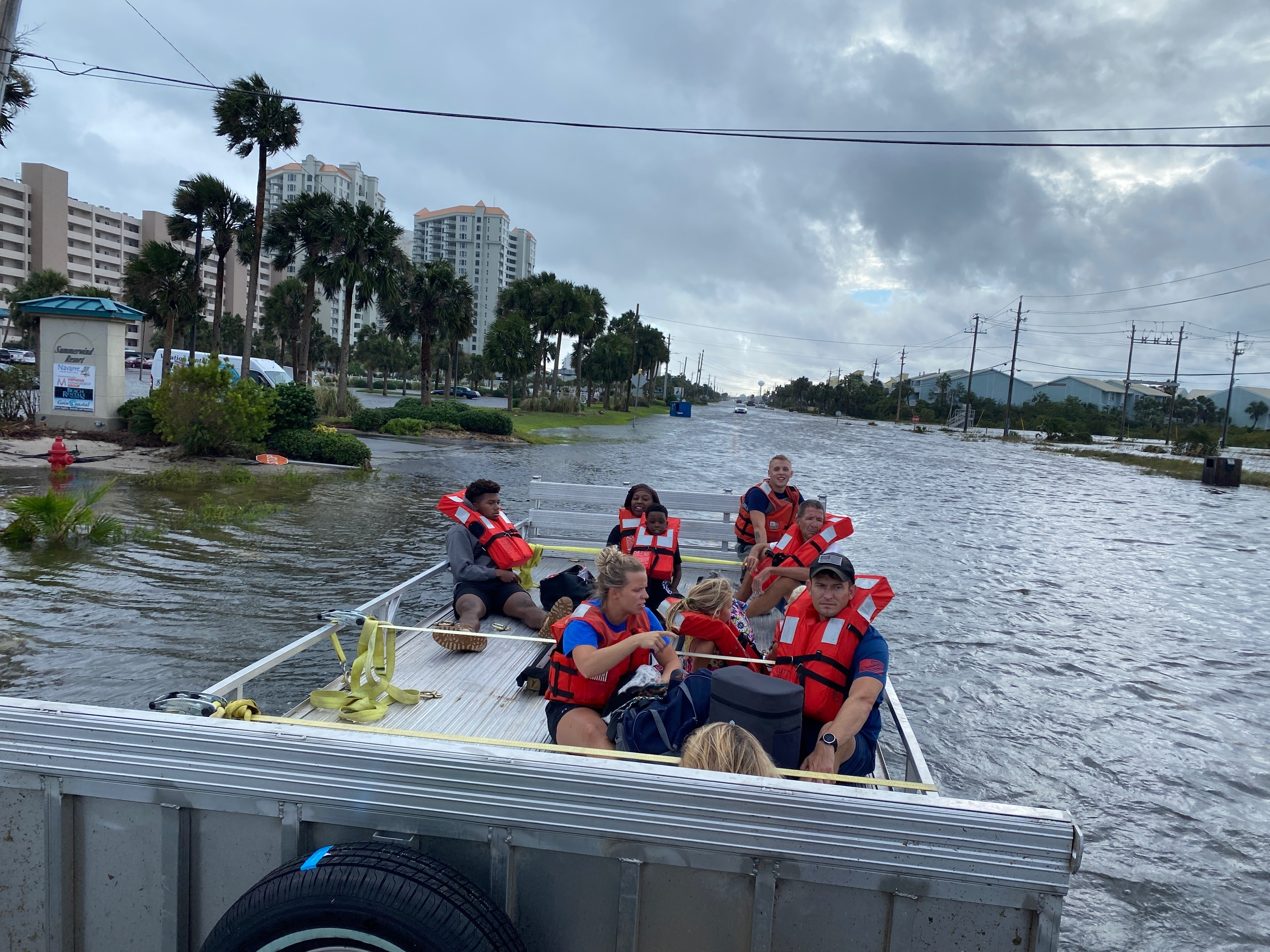
People after being rescued by a Coast Guard response team near Navarre, Florida

Due to the asymmetrical structure of Sally, almost all of Florida saw continuous shower and thunderstorm activity starting on September 12. A low-topped supercell in the outer rainbands of Sally prompted a tornado warning east of Tampa near Sebring on September 12. The next day, another storm prompted two tornado warnings in southwestern Lee County. Several special marine warnings were also issued for the Florida coast due to possible waterspouts. An EF0 tornado south of Marianna damaged a shed and uprooted several trees on September 16. Sally caused heavy rainfall and moderate flooding in South Florida and the Florida Keys, with nearly 8.5 inches (220 mm) falling over Marathon, over 10 inches (250 mm) in Key West and peaking at 12 inches (300 mm) in Lower Matecumbe Key. Tropical storm-force gusts were reported in portions of the Miami metropolitan area.

Costliest Non-retired Hurricanes
Rank	Cyclone	Season	Damage
1	Sally	2020	$7.3 billion
2	Isaias	2020	$5.02 billion
3	Imelda	2019	$5.0 billion
4	Debby	2024	$4.5 billion
5	Zeta	2020	$4.4 billion
6	Karl	2010	$3.9 billion
7	Idalia	2023	$3.6 billion
8	Isaac	2012	$3.11 billion
9	Delta	2020	$3.09 billion
10	Lee	2011	$2.8 billion

The Panhandle area east of where Sally made landfall suffered the brunt of the storm in Florida. In Escambia County, which includes Pensacola, the sheriff kept police deputies out helping residents "as long as physically possible". In Santa Rosa County, the City of Gulf Breeze was impacted with widespread wind damage, storm surge flooding, and over 20 inches (510 mm) of rainfall in the first 24 hours and over 30 inches in 48 hours. Several area tornadoes also occurred. Damage totals are estimated to be $7 million to Gulf Breeze public facilities. The unincorporated Tiger Point saw 36 inches (91 cm) of rain, while Bellview saw 30 inches (760 mm). In Pensacola itself, over 24 inches (610 mm) of rain fell and storm surge flooding reached 5.6 feet (1.7 m), the third highest surge ever recorded in the city. Many streets were flooded and several parked cars were totaled when water got into their engines. Late on September 15, twenty-two barges in the Pensacola Bay broke loose due to heavy surf. Five of the barges washed up near downtown while the sixth was involved in another collision. The seventh lodged itself underneath the Garcon Point Bridge while the final one became lodged underneath the Pensacola Bay Bridge, located between cities of Pensacola and the Gulf Breeze causing the bridge to be temporarily closed. The next morning, a crane fell onto the same bridge, destroying a portion of the roadway. The Florida Department of Transportation was unable to assess any possible damage to the bridge due to ongoing high Water main breaks occurred inside the Gulf Breeze, causing the city to shut off water from the south side of Highway 98 inside city limits, where the majority of water main breaks occurred in order to isolate the leaks. Water main break also occurred in nearby Pensacola Beach, causing officials to advise residents to fill their bathtubs with water. The city of Panama City reported releases of raw sewage from several locations due to flooding from Hurricane Sally, prompting The Florida Department of Health to issue advises against swimming in Panama City until further notice. In Pensacola, a 27-year-old boater went missing when he left his home in a 12-foot jon, in an attempt to find his mother's pontoon boat that became untethered in the strong currents and whipping winds brought on by the hurricane; one week after his disappearance, his body was found washed ashore near the Blue Angel Recreation Park. Another person in Pensacola also died after succumbing to carbon monoxide poisoning from indoor generator use. The body of another missing boater, a 45-year-old female kayaker who had also gone missing at the height of the storm, was discovered, marking the third fatality of Pensacola and the state of Florida. The Shoal River in Okaloosa county saw its highest level in 20 years as a result of all the rain that fell from Sally. This resulted in parts of Crestview, Florida being evacuated and bridges on I-10 and SR 85 being closed to all traffic. Damage in Florida totaled to $180.113 million.

=== Alabama ===
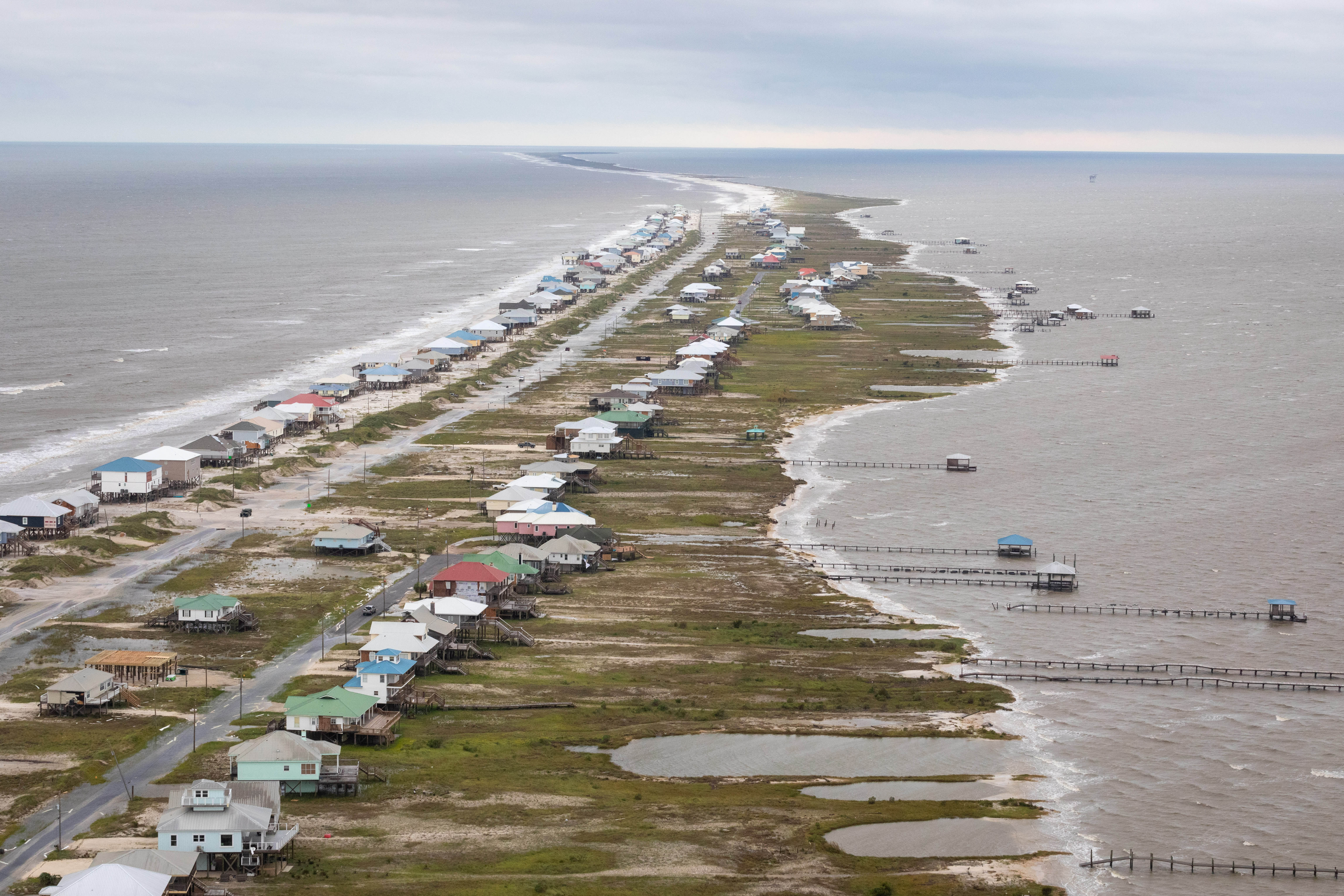
Customs and Border Protection Air and Marine agents survey damage caused by Hurricane Sally near Mobile, Ala., Sep 16, 2020

Continuous onshore flow from Sally caused storm surge flooding to occur on Dauphin Island beginning early on September 14. Two unoccupied riverboat casinos in Bayou La Batre near Mobile broke loose due to the constant wave action with one of them hitting a dock. A marine site in Ingram Bayou reported sustained winds of 113 miles per hour (182 km/h) and a gust to 137 miles per hour (220 km/h) at an elevation of 18 metres (59 ft). Fort Morgan, Alabama reported a wind gust of 121 miles per hour (195 km/h) while Mobile reported a wind gust of 83 miles per hour (134 km/h). Major structural damage was recorded at the landfall point in Gulf Shores as well as Mobile. A pier in Gulf Shores that was destroyed in Hurricane Ivan in 2004 was partially destroyed again by storm surge from Sally just days after it had reopened following renovations. There were also several reports of damage to condos in the Gulf Shores with a few being destroyed. Meanwhile, in Downtown Mobile, a street light snapped, swinging wildly on its cable. A gas station was destroyed in Spanish Fort, Alabama. Several sewage overflows were reported across Mobile County following heavy rain from Hurricane Sally, causing contamination to Dog River and Rabbit Creek. One person was declared dead and one other missing in Orange Beach, an area most impacted by flooding. Another person died in Foley during the storm cleanup process. Over 2,000 broken poles and 4,300 trees on power lines left over 71,000 households and businesses in southern and central Baldwin County without power, representing 95% of the service area of a local electrical cooperative, Baldwin EMC. Only 5 of 22 substations remained in service the day after the storm. Two days after landfall, on September 18, Alabama governor Kay Ivey said in a news conference that 103,000 customers were still without power in Baldwin County, and another 60,000 in Mobile County. Five days after landfall, Baldwin EMC had restored power to close to 60,000 meters, representing 75% of their subscribers, but 18,197 meters remained without power. Rainfall in the state peaked at 29.99 inches (762 mm) at Orange Beach.

Total damage in Alabama was estimated to be at least $311.895 million (2020 USD).

=== Elsewhere ===
The remnants of Sally affecting the Carolinas

The winds from the outer bands of Sally caused the south side of Lake Pontchartrain in Louisiana to overflow its banks, flooding Lakeshore Drive. However, no serious damage was reported as the storm veered farther east than originally forecast. Sally brought flooding to Mississippi, with the worst in Jackson County. At the peak of the storm, more than 10,000 people were without power along the Gulf Coast. Pascagoula police reported downed power lines and traffic lights in the city and a power outage on the eastern side of the city. Some parts of South Mississippi also reported uprooted trees and downed signs. Overall damage in Mississippi was expected to be much greater, but was reduced because the storm shifted east. In Georgia, six tornadoes were confirmed, of which two were rated EF1 while the other four were rated EF0. One person was killed and two others were injured after a large oak tree fell onto two homes and several cars in Atlanta. Two other fatalities occurred in metro Atlanta, one in Cobb County where a man died after a slick road caused a driver to lose control of his vehicle and hit the bus stop where the man was waiting at, and another in Gwinnett County where a 71-year-old woman was killed when a tree fell across the roadway, pinning her underneath it. In North Carolina and South Carolina, 16 more tornadoes were also confirmed from September 17–18. Two of them were rated EF1 and two others were rated EFU, while all the others were rated EF0. One person was injured indirectly as he was cleaning up debris from his mobile home following an EF0 tornado in Sardis, South Carolina.

== Aftermath ==
The storm caused widespread power outages across Baldwin County. Restoration of power took several days to bring back to 100%. The cities of Gulf Shores and Foley suffered the most extensive damage in Baldwin County. Due the large amount of damage in the city, a curfew was imposed in Mobile, Alabama, starting on September 16. Immediately after the storm, the Cajun Navy, a nonprofit rescue organization, began surveying damage in Alabama. The agricultural industry of Alabama, which was already under stress due to COVID-related impacts, suffered another devastating blow with many farmers' fields completely flooded, crops torn apart, and structures destroyed. Strong winds and heavy rainfall devastated crops, leaving many farmers across the state without hopes for a successful harvest.

== See also ==
- Tropical cyclones in 2020
- List of Category 2 Atlantic hurricanes
- List of costliest Atlantic hurricanes
- List of Alabama hurricanes
- List of Mississippi hurricanes
- List of Florida hurricanes (2000-present)
- Hurricane Frederic (1979) – Category 4 hurricane that heavily impacted Alabama.
- Hurricane Elena (1985) – Category 3 hurricane that also stalled in the northeastern Gulf of Mexico.
- Hurricane Danny (1997) – Stalled over Mobile Bay as a Category 1 hurricane.
- Hurricane Georges (1998) – Stalled in Mississippi before crawling eastward to the Florida Panhandle, dumping rainfall and causing extensive river flooding over similar areas.
- Hurricane Ivan (2004) – Affected the same areas on the same date 16 years earlier at Category 3 status, causing extensive damage.
- Hurricane Dennis (2005) – Caused catastrophic impact on Pensacola, Florida in July, just 15 years later before Sally took impact.
- Tropical Storm Julia (2016) – A weak tropical storm that formed over Florida four years prior to Sally, causing minor damage.
