= Tropical Storm Alberto (2018) =

Atlantic tropical storm

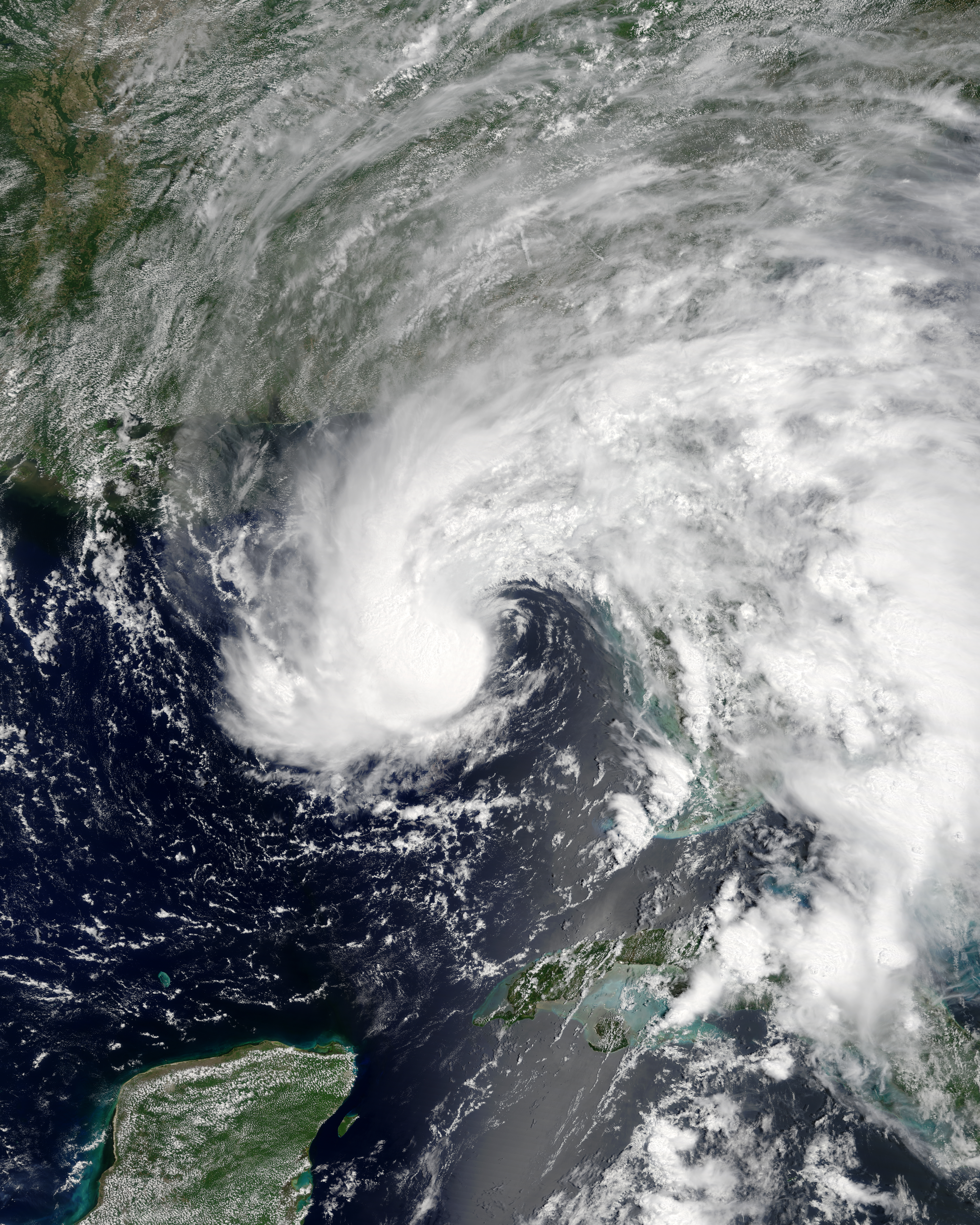
- Alberto as a subtropical storm approaching the Florida Panhandle on May 27

Meteorological history
- Formed: May 25, 2018
- Remnant low: May 31, 2018
- Dissipated: June 1, 2018

Tropical storm
- 1-minute sustained (SSHWS/NWS)
- Highest winds: 65 mph (100 km/h)
- Lowest pressure: 990 mbar (hPa); 29.23 inHg

Overall effects
- Fatalities: 18 total
- Damage: $125 million (2018 USD)
- Areas affected: Yucatán Peninsula, Cuba, Eastern United States, Canada
- IBTrACS
- Part of the 2018 Atlantic hurricane season

Tropical Storm Alberto was a destructive pre-season tropical cyclone which caused $125 million in damage in the Gulf Coast of the United States in May 2018, the costliest for any pre-season tropical cyclone. The first storm of the 2018 Atlantic hurricane season, Alberto developed on May 25 near the Yucatán Peninsula as a subtropical cyclone. As it entered the Gulf of Mexico, Alberto intensified and transitioned into a tropical cyclone. Early on May 28, Alberto reached its peak intensity, with maximum sustained winds of 65 mph (100 km/h) and a minimum pressure of 990 mbar (hPa; 29.23 inHg). Afterward, however, dry air caused Alberto to weaken before it made landfall near Laguna Beach, Florida, with winds of 45 mph (75 km/h). Alberto maintained a compact area of thunderstorms as it progressed through the central United States, entering southern Michigan as a tropical depression on May 31. That day, Alberto weakened further and dissipated over Ontario.

Along its path, Alberto dropped heavy rainfall, mainly to the east of its storm path. In Cuba, storm flooding killed ten people, and also damaged houses, roads and crops. Floodwaters caused an oil spill in Cienfuegos Bay. In the United States, Alberto caused about $125 million (2018 USD) in damage, as well as eight deaths. Five fatalities occurred in North Carolina, three of which were a result of landslides, and the other two from fallen trees. Flooding was responsible for the deaths of three people in Virginia. The storm caused coastal flooding along the United States Gulf Coast, most significantly in Florida where it moved ashore.

== Meteorological history ==
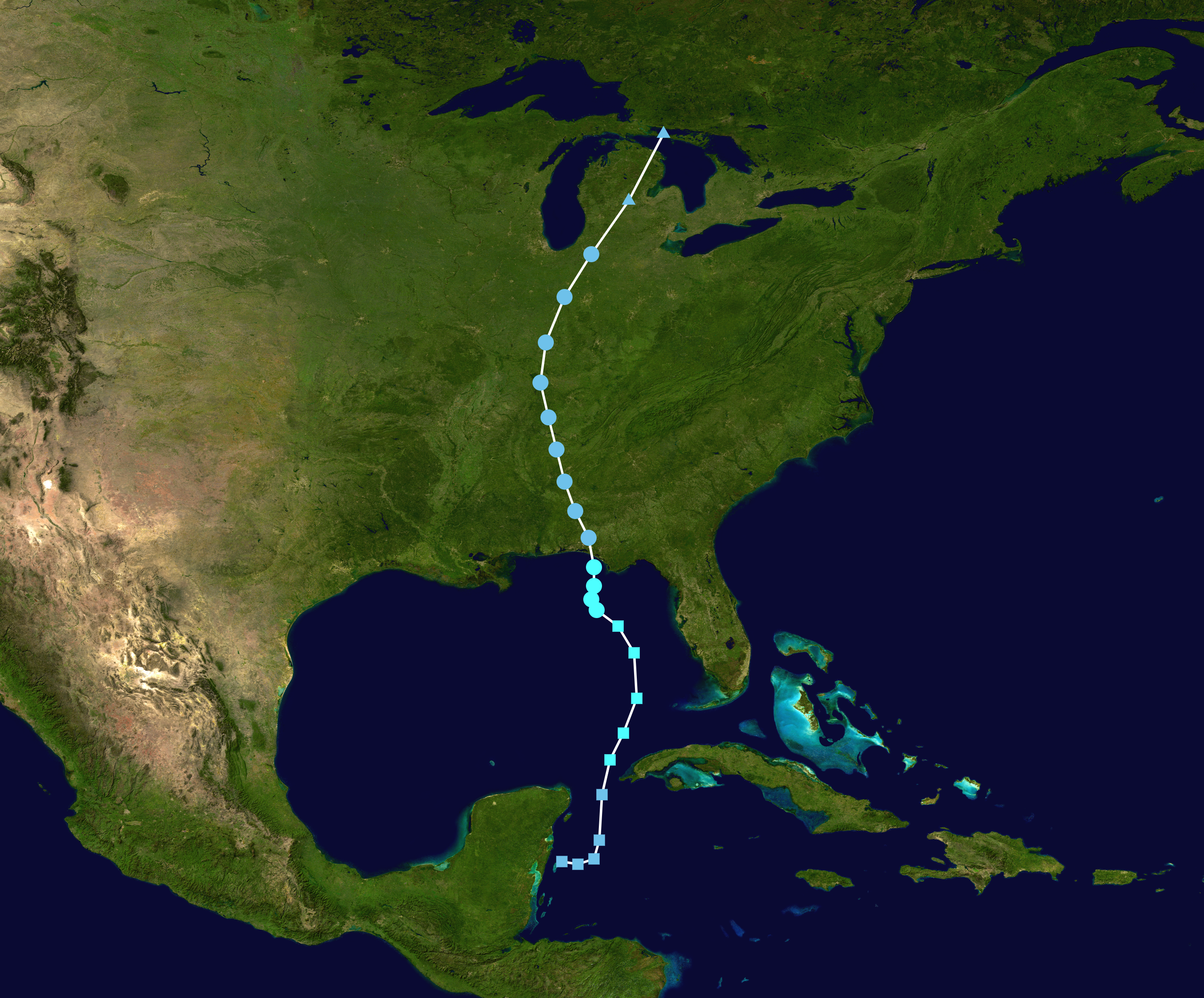
Map plotting the storm's track and intensity, according to the Saffir–Simpson scale Map key Saffir–Simpson scale Tropical depression (≤38 mph, ≤62 km/h) Tropical storm (39–73 mph, 63–118 km/h) Category 1 (74–95 mph, 119–153 km/h) Category 2 (96–110 mph, 154–177 km/h) Category 3 (111–129 mph, 178–208 km/h) Category 4 (130–156 mph, 209–251 km/h) Category 5 (≥157 mph, ≥252 km/h) Unknown Storm type Tropical cyclone Subtropical cyclone Extratropical cyclone, remnant low, tropical disturbance, or monsoon depression

On May 12, a trough moved eastward from Mexico and stalled over the Gulf of Mexico and the Caribbean Sea. By May 20, the trough had rotated into a northwest–southeast orientation, which increased diffluence and contributed to the formation of a broad low pressure area over the northwest Caribbean. Early on May 21, the National Hurricane Center (NHC) first indicated the potential for the low to undergo future cyclonic development. On May 23, the low moved over the eastern Yucatán Peninsula, where its development was impeded due to strong wind shear and dry air. On May 25, the low moved back over the Caribbean Sea and developed a well-defined circulation. That day, the NHC designated the system as a subtropical depression while it was located about 80 mi (130 km) east-northeast of Chetumal, Quintana Roo. The subtropical designation was due to the depression's interaction with an upper-level low, as well as its broad wind field, with multiple low-level circulations evident.

With most of the convection located east of the center, the subtropical depression remained disorganized as it moved northward. On May 26, the center redeveloped under the primary area of convection in the Gulf of Mexico, northeast of the previous weak circulation in the Caribbean. Soon after this structural improvement, the depression intensified into a subtropical storm off the northwest tip of Cuba, and was named Alberto. Operationally, the NHC considered Alberto a subtropical storm from its first advisory in the Caribbean. As Alberto moved parallel to Florida's west coast, a large band of thunderstorms persisted to the east of the storm's center, extending from Florida to Cuba. The thunderstorms concentrated near the center and became more symmetrical, a sign that the storm was transitioning into a tropical cyclone. Alberto became fully tropical by 00:00 UTC on May 28 while nearing the Florida panhandle. Around that time, the Hurricane Hunters observed maximum sustained winds of 65 mph (100 km/h), which would be the storm's peak intensity.

While near its maximum intensity, Alberto moved slowly around the northern side of an upper-level low, and the intrusion of drier air into the circulation caused the thunderstorms to weaken. Tropical Storm Alberto made landfall near Laguna Beach, Florida at 21:00 UTC on May 29 with sustained winds of 45 mph (75 km/h). Operationally, the NHC maintained the system as a subtropical storm, although the agency noted ambiguity with the storm's structure. Alberto quickly weakened to a tropical depression as it moved inland, although it maintained an area of thunderstorms over a well-defined center. The system maintained its structure and intensity over land due to a phenomenon known as the brown ocean effect, in which sufficient ground moisture negates the otherwise deleterious effects that tracking inland has on a tropical cyclone. On May 30, an approaching trough turned the system northeastward, and Alberto entered southern Michigan as a tropical depression the following day. Soon thereafter, however, the system degenerated into a remnant low pressure area. The low crossed Lake Huron and dissipated over western Ontario by 12:00 UTC that day.

== Preparations ==
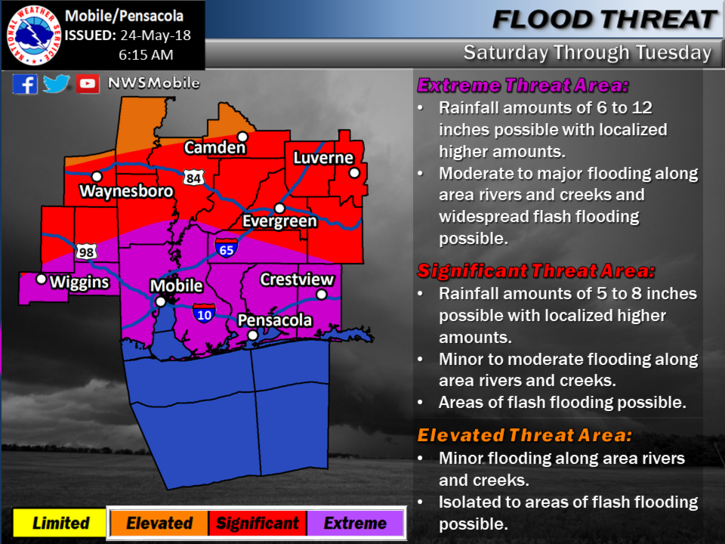
Initial rain forecast from NWS showing significant rain in the Pink areas.

Upon the classification of Alberto as a subtropical storm, the Government of Mexico issued a tropical storm watch for the east coast of the Yucatán Peninsula from Tulum to Cabo Catoche. The Government of Cuba also issued a tropical storm watch for the province of Pinar del Río. The tropical storm watch for the east coast of the Yucatán Peninsula was discontinued at 12:00 UTC on May 26, while the tropical storm watch for Pinar del Río was replaced with a tropical storm warning three hours later.

Multiple tropical storm watches and warnings were issued across the Gulf Coast of the United States in preparation for Alberto's arrival. The first advisories were issued at 21:00 UTC on May 25, with a tropical storm watch being issued from Indian Pass, Florida, westward to Grand Isle, Louisiana, and a storm surge watch being issued from Horseshoe Beach, Florida, to the mouth of the Mississippi River. At 15:00 UTC the following day, a tropical storm warning was issued for the Dry Tortugas in the Florida Keys, and the storm surge watch on the Gulf Coast of the United States was extended eastward to Crystal River, Florida. At 21:00 UTC, tropical storm warnings were issued for the west coast of Florida from Bonita Beach to the Anclote River, and for the northern Gulf Coast from the Aucilla River westward to the Mississippi/Alabama border. All warnings were discontinued after the tropical cyclone moved ashore.

A state of emergency was declared for the states of Mississippi, Alabama and Florida, where Alberto was expected to have the greatest impacts. In advance of Alberto, multiple evacuation orders were issued for parts of Florida. In Franklin County, a mandatory evacuation order was put in place for its barrier islands, while in nearby Taylor County, a voluntary evacuation order was issued for coastal areas. Florida governor Rick Scott declared a state of emergency for the entirety of Florida on May 26. In the Gulf of Mexico, oil companies Exxon Mobil Corp, Royal Dutch Shell and Chevron Corporation evacuated workers and shut down production platforms in Alberto's path.

== Impact ==
=== Northwestern Caribbean ===
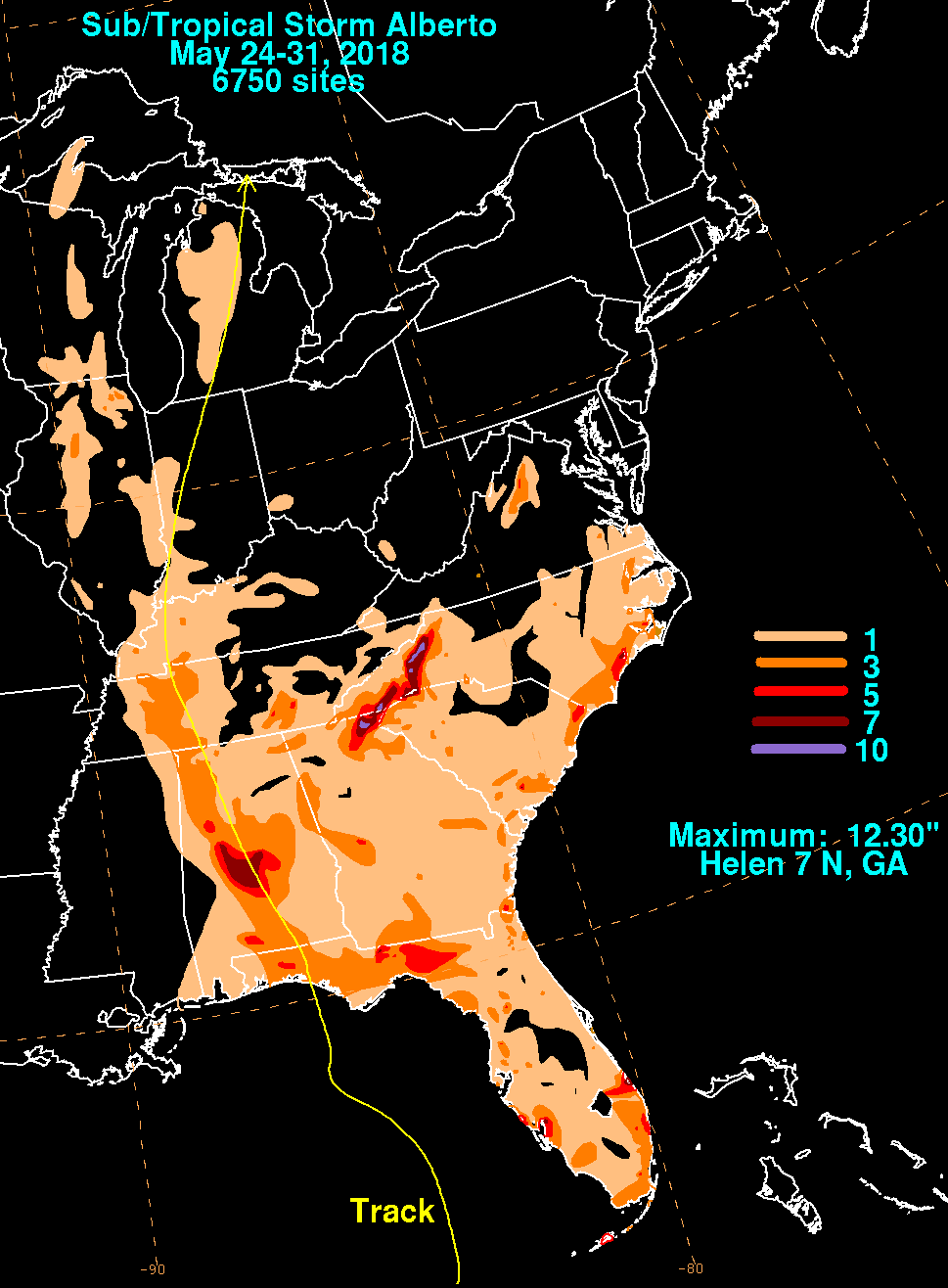
Total rainfall associated with Alberto in the United States

Alberto produced heavy rainfall along the Yucatán Peninsula, causing flooding in Mérida, Yucatán.

During its formative stages, Alberto also dropped heavy rainfall across much of western Cuba, peaking at 14.41 inches (366 mm) in Heriberto Duquezne, Villa Clara. At least 7 in (180 mm) of rainfall fell in Pinar del Rio, Artemisa, Matanzas, Cienfuegos, Sancti Spíritus and Ciego de Avila provinces. The rain caused flooding and landslides across central and western Cuba, killing ten people due to drowning, and forcing at least 40,000 people to evacuate their homes. Zaza Reservoir, Cuba's largest reservoir, rose to its second-highest level on record. Storm surge and abnormally high tides caused coastal flooding on Isla de la Juventud, and from Pinar del Río to Mayabeque Province.

Alberto's flooding in Cuba forced more than 52,000 people to leave their houses. Power cuts affected nearly 60,000 people. Nationwide, the storm damaged 5,218 houses, as well as 9,582 hectares (23,680 acres) of crops. Elevated water levels in Zapata Swamp submerged hundreds of houses, with floodwaters persisting even 18 days after the storm. Flooding damaged roads and bridges, isolating some villages and impeding transportation and relief aid. In Taguasco, a bridge across the Zaza River was swept away, with reconstruction commencing a few weeks after the storm. Floodwaters inundated numerous streets, including Autopista A1 in Villa Clara Province, forcing authorities to close the road. At the Cienfuegos oil refinery, the water treatment pond overflowed amid storm flooding, which spilled about 12,000 m^{3} (420,000 ft^{3}) of oily water into Cienfuegos Bay. Despite cleanup efforts, the oil spill negatively affected the area's ecosystem. After the storm, officials provided food and building supplies to residents who sustained storm damage, and planted crops to regrow the damaged supply.

=== United States ===
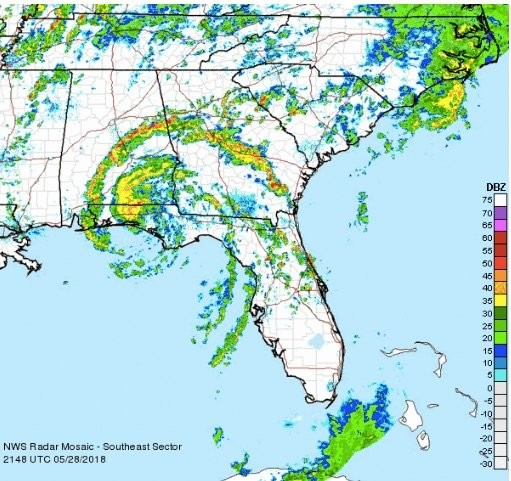
Radar image of Alberto near landfall

Across the United States, Alberto caused about $125 million in wind and water damage, and was responsible for eight deaths. In North Carolina, landslides killed a woman in Polk County, North Carolina and two women near Boone when a gas leak caused an explosion. WYFF News 4 anchor Mike McCormick and photojournalist Aaron Smeltzer died while covering the storm after a tree fell onto their vehicle on U.S. Route 176. In Virginia, flooding killed two people near Charlottesville and one person in Madison County.

Alberto dropped heavy rainfall across Florida for several days. This contributed to Florida having the wettest May on record in 2018. The highest precipitation total in the state was 11.8 in (300 mm) at Taylor Creek on the northern shore of Lake Okeechobee. A Flash Flood Warning was issued for Okaloosa and Walton Counties around the time of landfall. Along the Florida panhandle, the storm produced a 3.08 ft (0.94 m) storm surge at Apalachicola, which inundated nearby coastal roads, beaches, boat ramps, and parks. Floodwaters entered five buildings and a restaurant along the Florida panhandle. Winds in the state were strongest near where the storm moved ashore, with a peak gust of 59 mph (94 km/h) recorded along the St. George Island Bridge, as well as sustained winds of 51 mph (81 km/h). The winds knocked down dozens of trees, some of which fell onto roads and power lines. In Tallahassee, about 9,000 people lost power during the storm. Downed trees damaged one house in Wakulla and Holmes counties. In Jefferson County, a tree fell onto a vehicle on Interstate 10, which seriously injured two people. In Port Salerno far from the storm's landfall, Alberto's outer rainbands spawned a brief EF0 tornado, which lifted a trampoline into nearby power lines.

West of the storm's landfall, Alberto flooded coastal areas of Alabama, Mississippi and Louisiana as the storm moved ashore. High winds caused localized tree damage in southeastern Alabama. The storm's outer rainbands spawned an EF0 tornado near Cameron, South Carolina. The tornado was on the ground for 0.3 miles (0.48 km) and had winds reaching at least 80 mph (130 km/h), strong enough to lift trees, damage crops, and cause minor structural damage. The heaviest rainfall occurred east of the storm's path. The highest rainfall in the United States was 12.30 in (312 mm), recorded near Helen, Georgia. Farther northeast, Jonas Ridge, North Carolina recorded 12.21 in (310 mm) of rainfall. Intense precipitation in western North Carolina caused flooding along several rivers. The Catawba River near Pleasant Garden, North Carolina crested at 15.7 ft (4.8 m), nearly 5 ft (1.5 m) above flood stage. Heavy rainfall triggered mudslides along the Blue Ridge Mountains, and caused numerous waterways to exceed their banks. Flooding closed more than 40 roads in western North Carolina. Concern about the failure of the Lake Tahoma Dam led to the evacuation of 2,000 people until the structure was considered safe. A flash flood emergency was also issued in the area. Flooding also occurred in parts of Georgia, Kentucky, South Carolina, Tennessee, and Virginia. Farther inland, Alberto spawned two weak tornadoes, one near Marseilles, Illinois, the other near Pleasant Hill, Ohio. The latter tornado damaged an outbuilding. In Illinois, heavy rainfall from the storm, combined with previous rains earlier on in the month, set records for the month of May in several cities, including Chicago.

== See also ==
- Other storms of the same name
- List of off-season Atlantic hurricanes
- List of Alabama hurricanes
- List of Florida hurricanes (2000–present)
- Tropical Storm Arlene (1959) – Another May tropical storm that struck the northern Gulf Coast
- Tropical Storm Arlene (2005) – Another tropical cyclone that made a similar track back in 2005.
- Hurricane Michael (2018) – Catastrophic Category 5 hurricane that made landfall in a similar location only a few months later.
