= List of Alabama hurricanes =

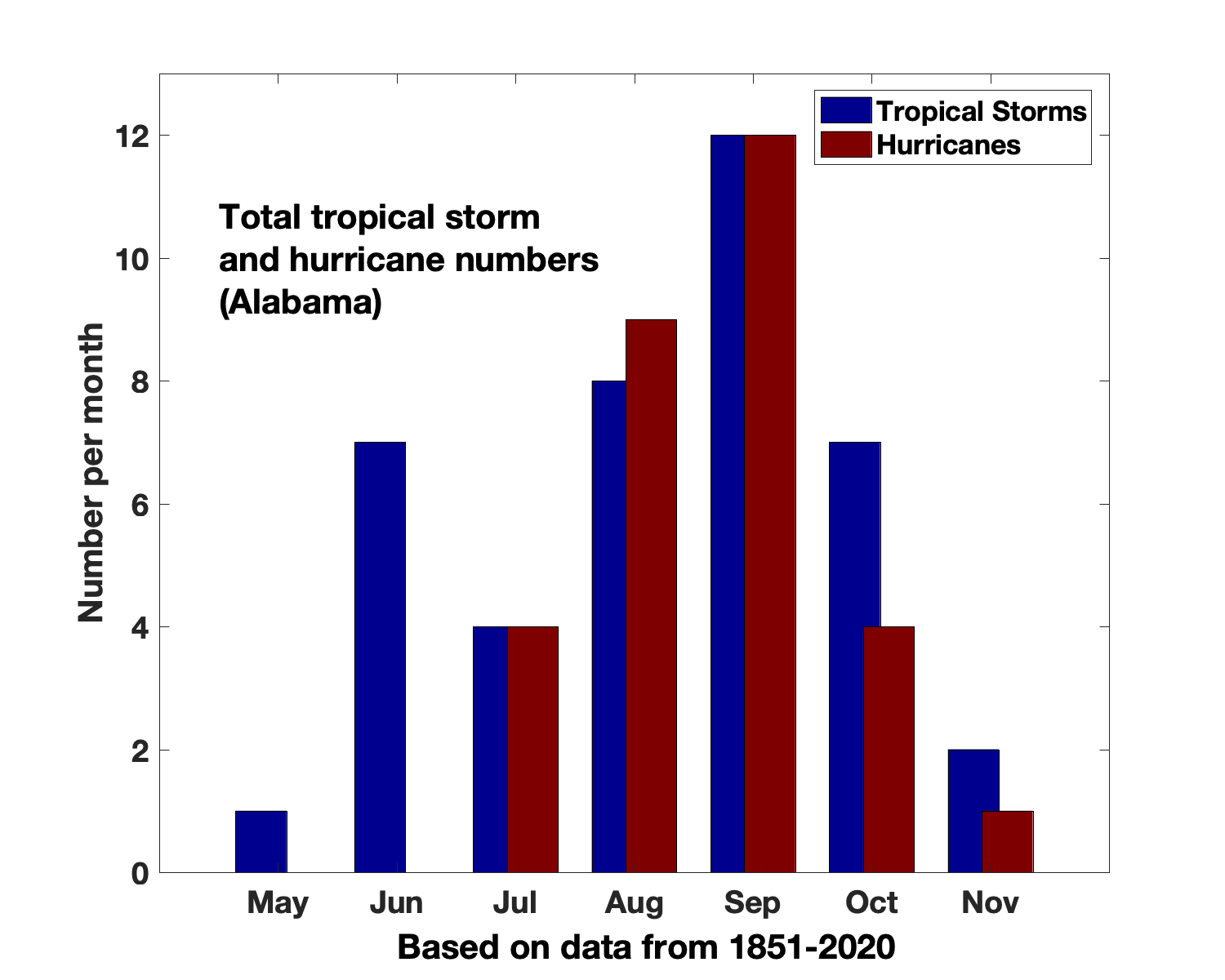
Monthly distribution of Alabama hurricanes and tropical storms from 1851 to 2020

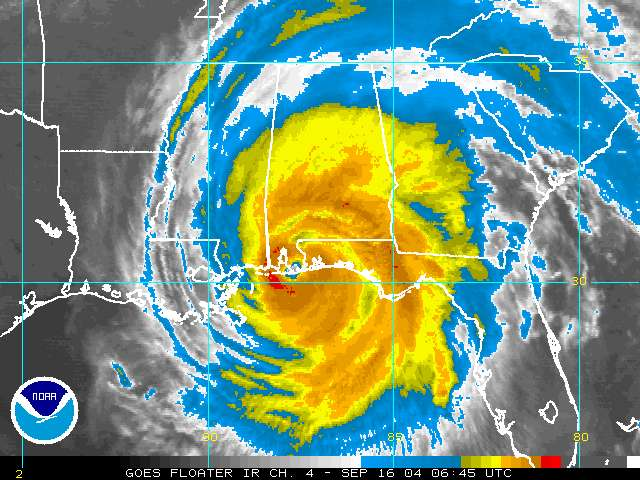
Infrared imagery of Hurricane Ivan making landfall in Alabama in 2004

An Alabama hurricane is a North Atlantic tropical cyclone that affected the U.S. state of Alabama. So far (as of July 2022) 83 tropical and subtropical cyclones have directly or indirectly affected Alabama since HURDAT began in 1851. Only three major hurricanes, the 1926 Miami hurricane, Hurricane Frederic (1979), Hurricane Ivan (2004) and only one off-season storm, Tropical Storm Alberto (2018) have made landfall in Alabama.

== Storms ==
=== Pre-1900 ===
- August 26, 1852: The Great Mobile Hurricane made landfall in Pascagoula, Mississippi and also brought category 3 winds to Alabama. Later that day, as a Category 1, it moved over Alabama.
- September 16, 1859: A hurricane made landfall in Alabama as a Category 1.
- August 12–13, 1860: The 1860 Mississippi hurricane, after making landfall in Mississippi, moved over Alabama as a Category 1.
- September 14–16, 1860: A hurricane made landfall in Louisiana as a Category 2. It damaged the coast from landfall to Mobile, Alabama, which lost $1 million in cotton stored on flooded wharves, just a month after the wharves were flooded by the previous hurricane.
- July 30, 1870: This Category 1 hurricane made landfall near Mobile, Alabama, although little is known about its origin. Though brief, this storm caused damage along the shores of Mobile Bay, to several steamboats in the Bay, and a floating dry dock broke free and was forced about 8 mi (13 km) up the Mobile River.
- September 19–20, 1877: An eastward-moving Category 1 hurricane passed close to Alabama. The next day, as a tropical storm, it traveled close to the Florida-Alabama border.
- October 16, 1879: After making landfall on the Florida Panhandle, a tropical storm moved over Alabama before dissipating the same day.
- September 1, 1880: After making landfall in Florida, a tropical storm moved over Alabama before dissipating over Mississippi.
- September 10, 1882: After making landfall in Florida, the 1882 Pensacola hurricane moved over Alabama as a category 1 hurricane.
- August 30–31, 1885: A tropical storm made landfall near Panama City, Florida in the late hours of August 30. Early the next morning, it traveled close to Alabama.
- September 28, 1885: After making landfall near Biloxi, Mississippi, a tropical storm moved over Alabama, near Mobile.
- July 28, 1887: After making landfall in Florida, a weakening Category 1 hurricane moved over Alabama. In the late hours of July 28, it dissipated over Alabama.
- October 20, 1887: The 13th storm in the 1887 Atlantic hurricane season, after making landfall near Biloxi, moved over Alabama, scraping Mobile and Andalusia.
- June 27–28, 1888: A weak tropical storm, though the first to make landfall in the state since 1859, made landfall on the 27th before briefly moving over Florida, and going back into Alabama. On the 28th, it made landfall in Andalusia right before weakening into a tropical depression and dissipating.
- September 23, 1889: Hurricane Six (1889) made landfall in Alabama as a tropical storm.
- September 13, 1892: After making landfall just east of Pensacola, Tropical Storm Four (1892) weakened into a tropical depression, moved over Alabama, and became extratropical.
- August 8, 1894: The 1894 Alabama–Mississippi tropical storm made landfall near Orange Beach, Alabama. The storm caused heavy rain and tornadoes.
- July 8, 1896: The first storm of the 1896 season, after making landfall as a Category 2 in Florida, moved over Alabama for a couple of hours before quickly moving northward.
- August 3, 1898: After making landfall in Florida, a former Category 1 hurricane but now a tropical storm, moved over Alabama and dissipated.

=== 1900s ===
- September 18, 1901: The 1901 San Vicente hurricane moved over Alabama briefly.
- October 11, 1902: After making landfall in Pensacola, Florida, 1902's Hurricane Four moved over Alabama as a tropical storm.
- November 3, 1904: This was the first storm since HURDAT records began to affect Alabama in the month of November. Tropical Storm Six (1904), after making landfall in Florida, moved east-northeastward, moving over Alabama briefly.
- September 27, 1906: A category 2 hurricane made landfall in Pascagoula, Mississippi, causing devastating damage to ships, rail lines and structures in Mobile.
- June 29, 1907: A tropical storm made landfall in Florida and affected Alabama.
- August 12, 1911: Hurricane Two (1911) was the first storm since 1859 to make landfall in Alabama as a hurricane. After making landfall, the storm weakened into a tropical storm and crossed the Alabama-Mississippi border.
- July 16–17, 1912: After Tropical Storm Two (1912) made landfall in Georgia, it weakened into a depression and moved over Alabama, hitting Enterprise. Later on July 17, it dissipated.
- September 18, 1914: The first and only tropical storm of that year's Atlantic hurricane season, after making landfall in Georgia, moved over Alabama, Florida, Alabama again, and then dissipated the next day over the Gulf of Mexico.
- October 18, 1916: Hurricane Fourteen (1916), a Category 2 hurricane, was, at the time, the strongest landfalling hurricane in Alabama since HURDAT began in 1851. After making landfall in Alabama, the storm moved over Florida, then back into Alabama. The storm brought 11.6 feet of storm surge to Mobile and caused 4 deaths. It weakened as it moved further inland.
- September 29, 1917: The 1917 Nueva Gerona hurricane, at Category 3 intensity, made landfall in Florida, though by the time it reached Alabama, it had weakened into a tropical storm.
- July 5, 1919: Tropical Storm One (1919), after making landfall just east of Pensacola, Florida, moved over Alabama and dissipates the same day.
- October 17, 1922: The remnants of Tropical Storm Five (1922), which by then had weakened into a tropical depression, turned extratropical near Mobile. They continued slightly further north before dissipating in central Alabama.
- June 26, 1923: Tropical Storm One (1923), after making landfall near Biloxi, Mississippi, moved over Alabama. While inland, it weakened into a tropical depression.
- September 21, 1926: The 1926 Miami hurricane was the first major hurricane (Note: A major hurricane is a tropical cyclone that ranks as a Category 3 or higher on the Saffir–Simpson scale.) landfall recorded in Alabama. Originally a Category 4, it made landfall in Alabama as a Category 3 hurricane on the Saffir–Simpson scale. The storm produced 18.5 inches of rain in the Bay Minette area and caused extensive damage along the Alabama coast.
- October 6, 1934: After making landfall just west of Pensacola, Florida, Tropical Storm Eleven (1934) transitioned into an extratropical cyclone and traveled just east of Andalusia before dissipating entirely.
- August 1, 1936: After making landfall on the Florida Panhandle, Hurricane Five (1936) reached Alabama as a minimal Category 1 hurricane. It weakened as it moved further inland and dissipated that night.
- August 23, 1936: Moving westward across the Gulf Coast, the weak depression that was once Tropical Storm Nine (1936) briefly moved over Alabama.
- August 31 – September 1, 1937: After making landfall in Florida, Tropical Storm Three (1936) moved over Alabama, weakening into a tropical depression just west of Andalusia.
- June 16, 1939: Tropical Storm One (1939) made landfall east of Mobile.
- August 13–17, 1939: Hurricane Two (1939), after making landfall in Florida, weakened into a tropical storm and began to move over Alabama. Later on August 13, it weakened into a tropical depression and began to move very slowly. Finally, on August 18, it reached Tennessee.
- September 11, 1944: Tropical Storm Six (1944) made landfall in Mobile. While moving northeast, it weakened into a tropical depression.
- July 9–11, 1948: An unlabeled tropical storm (later numbered "Two") made landfall in Pensacola, Florida. After doing so it weakened into a depression and moved over Alabama until it dissipated.
- August 31, 1950: Hurricane Baker, as a Category 1, made landfall just to the east of Mobile. As it moved further north, a death and two injuries occurred from downed power lines in Birmingham. Additionally, 10.89 inches of rain was recorded.
- September 27, 1953: Hurricane Florence (1953), after making landfall west of Lynn Haven, Florida, weakened into a tropical storm and moved over Alabama briefly. As it passed just south of Dothan, as well as causing 14.71 inches of rain, Florence transitioned into an extratropical cyclone and dissipated over Georgia.
- September 25, 1956: Hurricane Flossy, after making landfall on the Florida Panhandle, moved close to Alabama as a Category 1 hurricane. While doing so, it dropped 10–15 inches of rain in Mobile and Baldwin County.
- September 8, 1957: Tropical Storm Debbie, after making landfall west of Lynn Haven, Florida, moved over Alabama, hitting Dothan. 6.81 inches of rain was recorded in Alabama.
- October 8–9, 1959: Tropical Storm Irene made landfall just to the east of Mobile. Moving east-northeast, it weakened into a tropical depression while traveling west of Montgomery. On October 9, Irene dissipated over northern Alabama. Irene brought 3.81 inches of rain to Athens.
- September 26, 1960: The tropical depression remnants of Tropical Storm Florence (1960) made landfall near Mobile, then dissipated. 5.58 inches of rain was recorded in Dothan Municipal Airport.
- October 5, 1964: The extratropical remnants of Hurricane Hilda moved over Alabama for about three hours. They caused 8.91 inches of rain in Alabama.
- June 15, 1965: Tropical Storm One (1965), after making landfall on the Florida Panhandle, very briefly moved over Alabama, before becoming extratropical over Georgia. One caused 6.3 inches of rain in downtown Mobile.
- October 1, 1969: An unnamed subtropical storm (numbered "Subtropical Storm One"), after weakening into a subtropical depression and making landfall in Florida, reached the Florida-Alabama border, and dissipated. One caused 3.38 inches of rainfall in Camden.

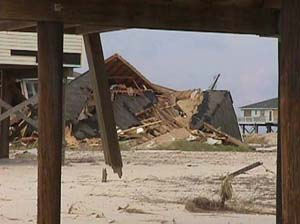
A home destroyed by Hurricane Georges' storm surge

- September 23, 1975: Eloise did not make a direct landfall, but still reached Alabama at hurricane strength after making landfall in Florida. A maximum total of 7.67 inches of rain was recorded in Alabama.
- July 19, 1977: An unnumbered tropical depression made landfall east of Mobile before dissipating.
- September 9–14, 1979: Hurricane Frederic was the strongest hurricane on record to make landfall in Alabama. Frederic brought sustained winds of 130 mph and a gust to 145 mph when it made landfall in Dauphin Island. 8.55 inches of rainfall occurred in Mobile Regional Airport.
- July 20, 1980: Tropical Depression One (1980), after moving slowly westward, made landfall in Gulfport, Mississippi and dissipated the next day.
- September 2, 1985: Hurricane Elena brought category 3 winds and 8.5 feet of storm surge while moving along the Gulf of Mexico near Alabama.
- October 31 – November 1, 1985: Hurricane Juan, on Halloween, made landfall in Alabama, southeast of Mobile and moved northward, hitting Birmingham and Huntsville. Juan caused 12.23 inches of rain in Fairhope.
- July 4–7, 1994: Tropical Storm Alberto, after making landfall in Florida and weakening into a tropical depression, moved over Alabama for 3 days. In Enterprise, 22.63 inches of rain were recorded.
- August 3, 1995: Hurricane Erin, as a Category 1 hurricane, and after very briefly making landfall in Florida, moved over Alabama destroying 100 homes and 50–75% of the pecan crop in the affected area. 8.37 inches of rain was recorded in Bay Minette.
- October 4–5, 1995: Hurricane Opal, after making landfall in Florida, moved over Alabama as a Category 1 hurricane, and passed west of Montgomery as it moved north. Dauphin Island recorded 7 feet of storm surge. Brewton recorded 19.42 inches of rain from Opal.
- July 19–22, 1997: Hurricane Danny was the first hurricane to make landfall in Alabama since 1979, as a Category 1 hurricane. It weakened into a tropical storm and moved over Florida. Then Danny began to move over Alabama and weakened into a tropical depression. Dauphin Island recorded 37.75 inches of rain. Danny caused 4 deaths, and, according to the NHC, caused $100 million worth of damage in Alabama alone.
- September 29, 1998: Hurricane Georges made landfall in Biloxi, Mississippi as a Category 2, then moved eastward, over Alabama, as a tropical depression. It caused 29.66 inches of rain in Bay Minette. Georges also brought a 7–11 foot storm surge to Mobile and Baldwin counties and caused extensive damage along the coast, especially in Bayou La Batre and on Dauphin Island.

=== 2000s ===
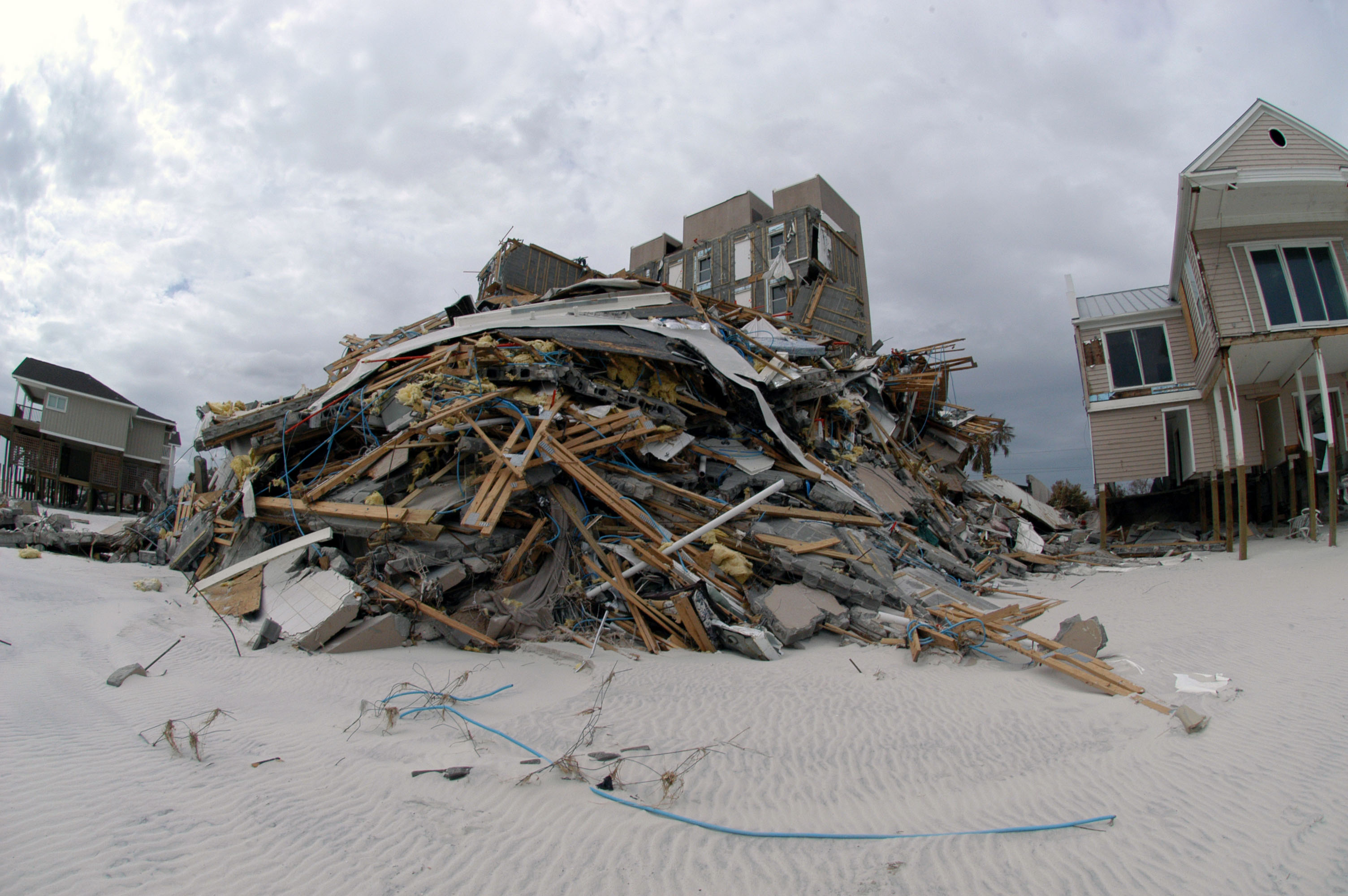
Debris and housing damage from Hurricane Ivan

- September 22, 2000: Tropical Storm Helene, after making landfall in Florida, weakened into a tropical depression and moved briefly over Alabama before reaching Georgia.
- June 11–12, 2001: After making landfall in Mississippi, Tropical Storm Allison moved over Alabama as a tropical depression before reaching Georgia. 11.36 inches of rain was recorded in Fairhope.
- August 6, 2001: After making landfall on the Florida Panhandle, Tropical Storm Barry weakened into a tropical depression and moved over Alabama. 4.57 inches of rain were recorded in Evergreen.
- September 16–17, 2004: As a Category 3 hurricane, Hurricane Ivan made landfall in Alabama. Ivan was only the third major hurricane on record to hit Alabama. Ivan brought historic storm surge to the coast. Rainfall peaked at 10.16 inches at Silver Hill.
- June 11–12, 2005: Tropical Storm Arlene made landfall at the Florida-Alabama border. As it moved inland, it weakened into a tropical depression. On June 12, it moved into Mississippi. 6.77 inches of rain were recorded in Alabama.
- July 11, 2005: Hurricane Dennis, after making landfall in Florida as a Category 3 hurricane, moved over Alabama as a tropical storm for a few hours. However, the rainfall was intense. 12.8 inches of rain (325 mm) was recorded in Camden.
- August 28–30, 2005: Hurricane Katrina caused 2 deaths and tropical storm-force winds in Alabama. Mobile Bay spilled into Mobile. Katrina brought 6.59 inches of rainfall to Alabama. For other effects, see the article Effects of Hurricane Katrina in Alabama.
- September 22, 2007: After making landfall in Florida, Tropical Depression Ten moved over Alabama and dissipated west of Mobile. Ten caused 3.05 inches of rain in Brewton.
- August 24–26, 2008: Tropical Depression Fay, after making landfall in Florida, erratically moved along Alabama. For a short time on August 25, it moved into Mississippi. On August 27, it turned extratropical in eastern Tennessee. 12.74 inches of rain was recorded in Alabama.
- August 17, 2009: The remnants of Tropical Storm Claudette, after making landfall on the Florida Panhandle, moved over Alabama as a tropical depression. Claudette caused minimal impact in Alabama and dissipated late that day. Claudette also brought 3.69 inches of rain in Alabama.
- November 10, 2009: The beginning of the extratropical cyclone that would become known as "Nor'Ida", which formed from the remnants of Hurricane Ida, made landfall in Dauphin Island, Alabama and later in mainland Alabama before moving into Florida. Ida also made the most landfalls in Alabama, 2. 9.83 inches of rain were recorded in Opelika.
- May 29, 2018: After Tropical Storm Alberto made landfall in Florida, it weakened into a tropical depression and moved through Alabama. 8.07 inches of rain were recorded in Cloverdale.
- October 10, 2018: Hurricane Michael caused $1.1 billion of damage in southeastern Alabama.
- September 16, 2020: Hurricane Sally made landfall near Gulf Shores, Alabama, causing significant inundation. Sally also became the first tropical cyclone to make a direct landfall in Alabama since Ivan.
- October 29, 2020: Hurricane Zeta made landfall near New Orleans, Louisiana. Wind gusts of 91 mph were recorded in Mobile, Alabama causing widespread damage and power outages.
- June 18, 2021: Tropical Storm Claudette passed through Alabama as a tropical depression, spawning tornadoes and killing 14 people.
- June 29, 2021: The remnants of Tropical Storm Danny brought mild rainstorms to Alabama.
- September 25–27 2024: Hurricane Helene brought rain to southeastern portions of the state, peaking at 9.42 inches near Eufaula.
- October 9–10, 2026: The remnants of Hurricane Isaias passed through the state as an extratropical cyclone, bringing widespread heavy rainfall and high winds, as well as resulting in numerous power outages. Two deaths were reported in the state.

== Listed by month ==
Alabama hurricanes by month
Month	Number of storms
May	1
June	9
July	12
August	17
September	28
October	14
November	3

== See also ==
- List of United States hurricanes
