= Hurricane Frederic =

Category 4 Atlantic hurricane in 1979

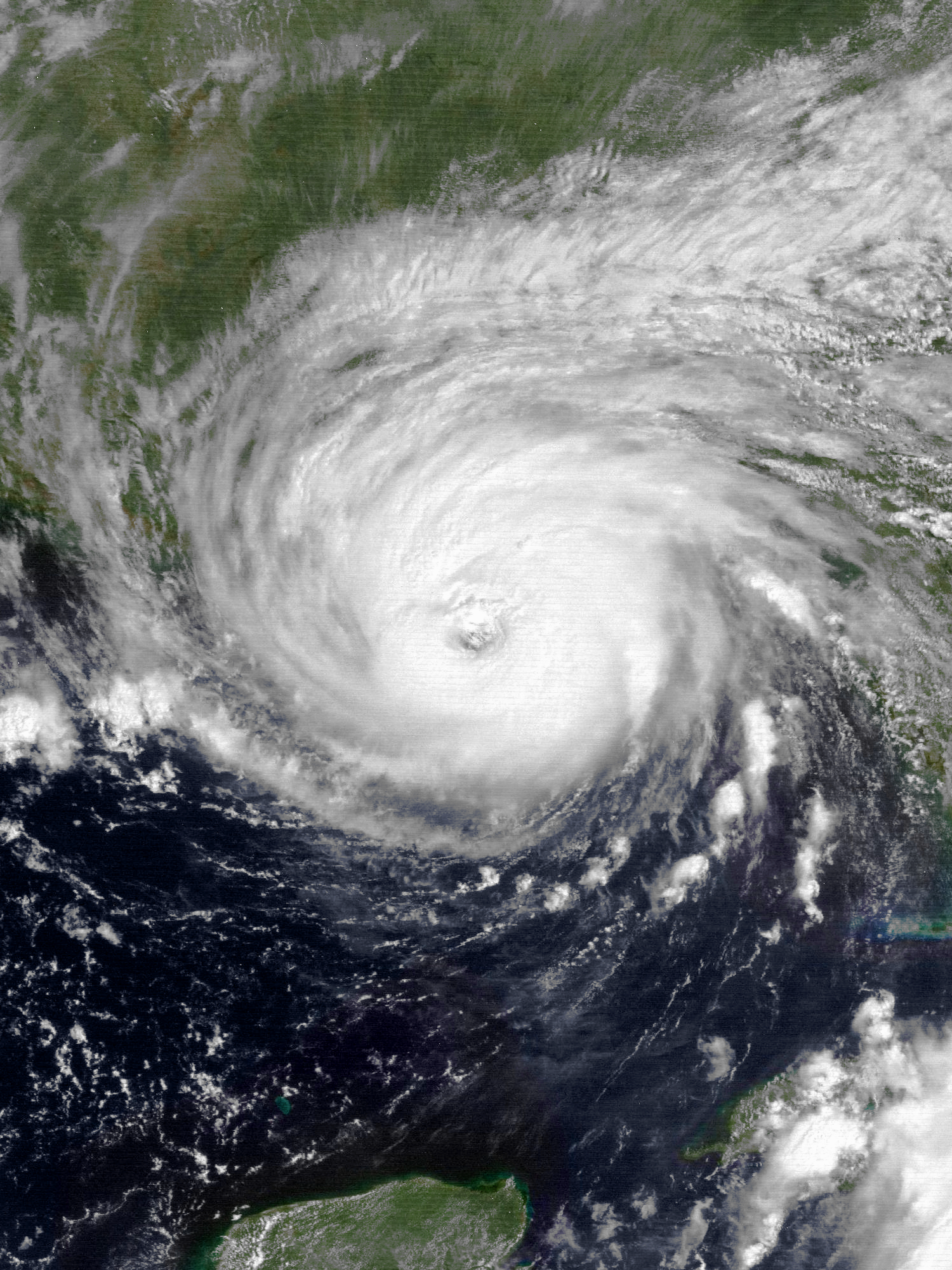
- Frederic at peak intensity near landfall on Dauphin Island on September 12

Meteorological history
- Formed: August 29, 1979
- Dissipated: September 15, 1979

Category 4 major hurricane
- 1-minute sustained (SSHWS/NWS)
- Highest winds: 130 mph (215 km/h)
- Lowest pressure: 943 mbar (hPa); 27.85 inHg

Overall effects
- Fatalities: 12
- Damage: $2.23 billion (1979 USD)
- Areas affected: Leeward Islands; Virgin Islands; Puerto Rico; Hispaniola; Cuba; East Coast of the United States; Atlantic Canada
- IBTrACS
- Part of the 1979 Atlantic hurricane season

Hurricane Frederic, known in Latin America as Federico, was an intense and destructive tropical cyclone that carved a path of destruction from the Lesser Antilles to Quebec, in particular devastating areas of the United States Gulf Coast. Though only five were killed directly, the US$1.77 billion in damage accrued by Frederic made it the Atlantic basin's costliest tropical cyclone on record at the time. Prior to its final landfall, the threat that Frederic imposed on areas of the U.S. Gulf Coast triggered a mass exodus from the region larger than any other evacuation in the past. While the storm primarily impacted the U.S. states of Mississippi and Alabama, lesser effects were felt throughout the Greater and Lesser Antilles, as well as inland North America.

Frederic was the thirteenth tropical cyclone, sixth named storm, third hurricane, and second major hurricane of the 1979 Atlantic hurricane season. It developed from a tropical depression south of the Cape Verde Islands on August 28. (Note: For consistency, Coordinated Universal Time (UTC) is used for all references of time as the cyclone existed in multiple time zones throughout its existence.) Tracking at a steady clip westward, the primitive cyclone reached tropical storm intensity the next day. Favorable conditions in the open Atlantic allowed for Frederic to reach hurricane intensity on September 1. However, outflow from nearby Hurricane David began to inhibit further intensification and would continue to do so for roughly a week, weakening Frederic as it tracked across the Greater Antilles. The tropical cyclone nearly dissipated over Cuba before redeveloping on September 9 near the Isle of Youth. From then on, Frederic moved northwestward, intensifying to its peak intensity in the Gulf of Mexico with winds of 130 mph (210 km/h) on September 12, shortly before making landfall at Dauphin Island, Alabama just below the state line between Alabama and Mississippi. Inland over the United States, Frederic rapidly weakened before becoming extratropical in Pennsylvania on September 14 and dissipating the next day.

Frederic is estimated to have inflicted at least $5 million in both Puerto Rico and the U.S. Virgin Islands, with an additional $2.22 billion in damage on the mainland United States. The Federal Emergency Management Agency (FEMA), which had been established only three months before Frederic hit, was the focal point for nearly $250 million in federal aid for recovery, $188 million of which went to Alabama. In southern Alabama, the landscape was changed for years, with thousands of tall pine trees tilted and leaning northwest.

== Meteorological history ==
Map plotting the storm's track and intensity, according to the Saffir–Simpson scale Map key Saffir–Simpson scale Tropical depression (≤38 mph, ≤62 km/h) Tropical storm (39–73 mph, 63–118 km/h) Category 1 (74–95 mph, 119–153 km/h) Category 2 (96–110 mph, 154–177 km/h) Category 3 (111–129 mph, 178–208 km/h) Category 4 (130–156 mph, 209–251 km/h) Category 5 (≥157 mph, ≥252 km/h) Unknown Storm type Tropical cyclone Subtropical cyclone Extratropical cyclone, remnant low, tropical disturbance, or monsoon depression

The precursor to Hurricane Frederic emerged as a loosely defined tropical wave off the west coast of Africa late on August 27. The following day, satellite images indicated that the tropical wave had become more defined, and was beginning to show signs of cyclonic rotation. At 0600 UTC on August 29, the National Hurricane Center (NHC) classified the system as a tropical depression based on observational data from ships nearby in conjunction with satellite images. Upon developing into a tropical cyclone, the depression moved at an unusually rapid pace westward, gradually curving towards the west-northwest and slowly intensifying in ideal conditions. At 1200 UTC on August 30, the tropical depression was upgraded to tropical storm status and thus named Frederic. Intensification continued after the storm's upgrade, and early on September 1, Frederic developed an eye, prompting the NHC to further upgrade the tropical cyclone to hurricane status at 0600 UTC that day.

Frederic only maintained hurricane intensity for roughly eighteen hours over the open waters of the Atlantic on September 1 before outflow from nearby Hurricane David began to adversely affect the tropical cyclone. At 0000 UTC on September 2, Frederic weakened back to tropical storm strength while it was still well east of the Lesser Antilles. This weakening phase continued as Frederic began to assume a more westerly track and slow in forward motion. On September 4, Frederic tracked over the Virgin Islands before making landfall on Puerto Rico later that day with maximum sustained winds of 50 mph (80 km/h). Frederic's interaction with Puerto Rico greatly disrupted the low-level circulation contained within the tropical cyclone, enhancing the weakening effects of Hurricane David's outflow. After passing over the island, the tropical storm briefly took a southwest course before curving into Hispaniola on September 6, inducing additional disruption within Frederic. At 1800 UTC that day, Frederic was downgraded to tropical depression status north of Haiti. Frederic remained a tropical depression for two days as it tracked into and then parallel to the southern coast of Cuba beginning on September 7. During this time, Hurricane David had tracked far into the Northeastern United States, and as a result its inhibiting effects of intensification ceased. At 0000 UTC on September 9, Frederic regained tropical storm intensity while located roughly 100 mi (160 km)/h) east of the Isle of Youth. The following day, the cyclone tracked over western Cuba as it gradually curved towards the northwest.

Favorable conditions, marked by very warm sea surface temperatures as high as 86 °F (30 °C) and the presence of a large anticyclone over the system, allowed Frederic to strengthen to hurricane status for a second time while just northwest of Cuba, despite proximity to land. Frederic took a northwesterly course throughout its trek across the Gulf of Mexico in early September, intensifying in a highly conducive environment. By 1800 UTC on September 10, the hurricane became stronger than it had ever been over the central Atlantic. At 0000 UTC on September 12, Frederic attained major hurricane status over the eastern Gulf of Mexico, and twelve hours later reached peak intensity with a minimum barometric pressure of 943 mbar (hPa; 27.85 inHg) and sustained winds of 130 mph (210 km/h), (Note: A major hurricane is a storm that ranks as Category 3 or higher on the Saffir–Simpson hurricane scale.) making the cyclone a Category 4 hurricane on the Saffir–Simpson hurricane wind scale. Moving gradually faster in the Gulf of Mexico, Frederic eventually made two landfalls – one on Dauphin Island and the other near the border between Alabama and Mississippi – with a virtually unchanged intensity. Tracking rapidly northward, Frederic began to weaken due to land interaction, and was downgraded to tropical storm status while it was near Meridian, Mississippi on September 13. At around the same time, the cyclone began to curve northeastward, eventually merging with an extratropical cyclone in southwestern Pennsylvania by 1800 UTC on September 14. These extratropical remnants proceeded to track through the Mid-Atlantic states and New England before they were last officially documented by the NHC in New Brunswick on September 15. However, the Canadian Hurricane Centre still considered the cyclone active up until the storm entered the Labrador Sea on September 16.

== Preparations ==
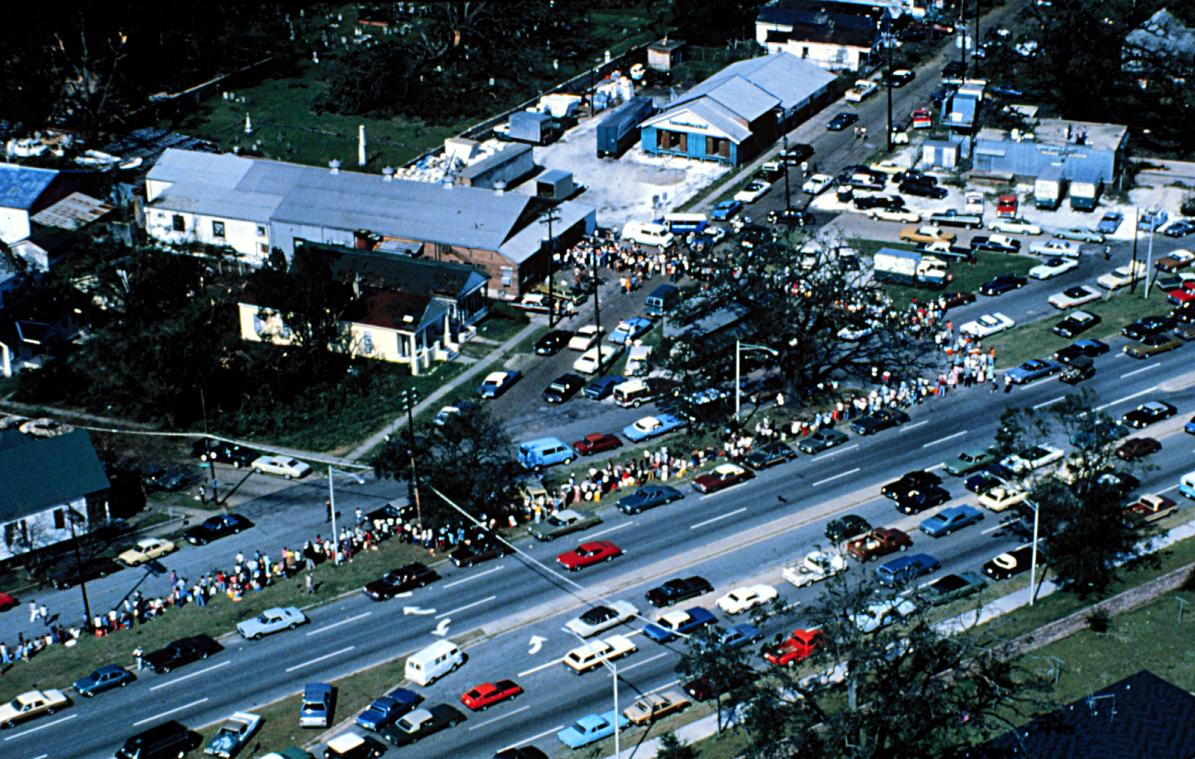
Evacuation out of the Mobile area

The first tropical cyclone watches and warnings issued in association with Frederic were on September 3, when the National Hurricane Center issued a hurricane warning and gale warning for several islands of the Lesser Antilles stretching from Dominica to the northern Leeward Islands. Residents of Charlotte Amalie in the United States Virgin Islands were urged by governor Juan Francisco Luis to move to 24 emergency shelters. Luis also mobilized a company of the Virgin Islands National Guard to expedite evacuations and protect emptied residences and other buildings from looting. Further south in Dominica, Melville Hall Airport was forced to close due to the presence of gale-force winds, delaying relief efforts following Hurricane David.

Despite having weakened to a tropical storm by the time Frederic moved over the Virgin Islands, the National Hurricane Center issued a hurricane watch for Puerto Rico on September 4. As precautionary measures, the Luis Muñoz Marín International Airport and schools closed for the duration of the storm. Hundreds of residents were ordered to evacuate from Toa Baja for the second time in just four days due to the threat of flooding rivers. In Trujillo Alto, a dike was relieved in order to mitigate potential flooding. After its track across Puerto Rico, gale warnings were issued for portions of the Dominican Republic and Haiti, as well as the Turks and Caicos Islands. No watches or warnings were issued by the NHC for any areas while Frederic was classified as a tropical depression over the Greater Antilles. However, small craft warnings were posted for some coastal regions off of Miami, Florida due to strong winds caused by the nearby tropical cyclone.

After Frederic reattained hurricane status in the Gulf of Mexico on September 10, a gale warning was issued for the Dry Tortugas; this was the first NHC warning issued in association with Frederic. Not long after, a hurricane watch was issued for coastal areas extending from Panama City, Florida to Vermilion Bay in Louisiana. Although forecasts showed that Frederic posed no threat to Sarasota, Florida, the city readied barrels of water if distribution was necessitated to Sarasota County's 58 emergency shelters. Municipality managers were asked to place their respective emergency personnel on standby. In Key West, Florida, city workers had shortened workdays while the storm moved close by.

At Keesler Air Force Base (AFB) in Biloxi, the staff declared HURCON 1 on the morning of September 12. Personnel at the base sand-bagged low lying areas and boarded up windows in preparation for the storm. Most aircraft on the base were flown out of the storm's path.

== Impact ==
=== Lesser Antilles and Puerto Rico ===
Effects from Frederic were first felt on the outward facing Leeward Islands. In Antigua, the threat of widespread power outages forced the insular government to shut down power. A peak gust of 62 mph (100 km/h) was documented on the island as a result of the storm. These strong winds also unroofed some buildings. Strong winds and rain were felt in Guadeloupe, Barbuda, and a number of other islands, but no damaging effects from the passing tropical cyclone occurred in those locations.

In St. Maarten, these strong winds toppled a radio antenna. Flowing floodwaters washed away plentiful food crops in the island. Some homes were damaged and others destroyed on the adjacent Sint Maarten. Off of the island, seven Japanese people were killed after their fishing boat sank during the storm.

Power outages knocked out electricity to half of Tortola in the British Virgin Islands and downed telephone lines. Rainfall and downed trees blocked several roads. Offshore, the yacht Princess blew out into sea, prompting a coast guard rescue of the ship and its crew.

As a tropical storm, Frederic dropped heavy rain across the U.S. Virgin Islands and Puerto Rico. Despite having weakened from its prior hurricane intensity, the storm still brought gale-force winds coupled with gusts as strong as 70 mph (110 km/h) to the area. Three buildings in an apartment complex on St. Thomas were unroofed, displacing roughly 50 families. Electricity was deliberately cut during the late night hours as a preventive measure. The entirety of the U.S. Virgin Islands reported numerous felled trees and downed utility lines as a result of the strong winds. Wind damage on nearby Puerto Rico was of only minor extent and much less severe than in the Virgin Islands. However, torrential precipitation accounted for most of the damage, as the passage of Hurricane David less than a week earlier saturated soils, priming the area for floods induced by the passage of Frederic. Rainfall peaked at around 10 in (250 mm) in 12 hours in Puerto Rico and 24.04 in (611 mm) in 30 hours in St. Croix.

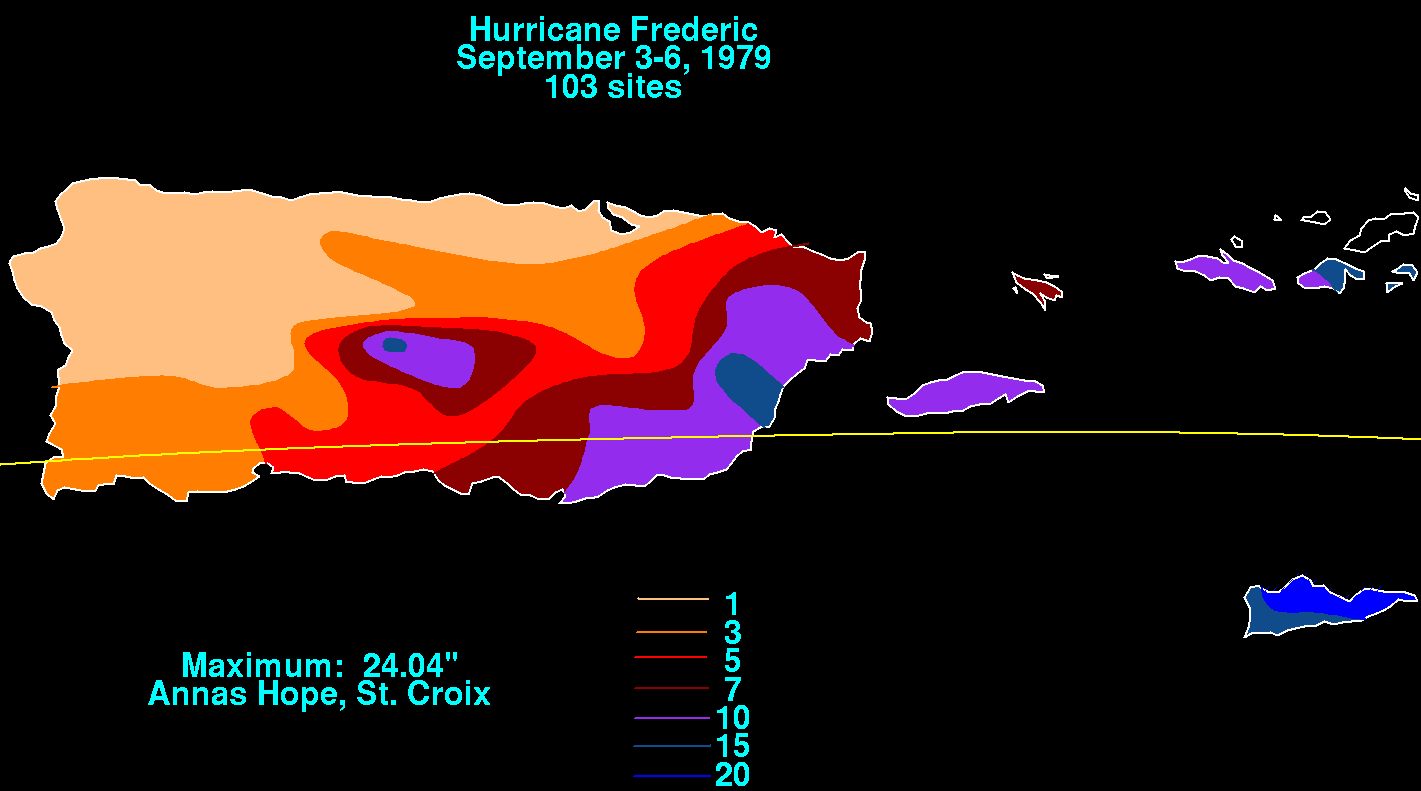
Rainfall totals in Puerto Rico and the U.S. Virgin Islands

All rivers in southeastern Puerto Rico swelled and produce significant flooding in adjacent floodplains. The discharge of the Rio Santiago near Naguabo reached 100-year levels. These floods partially inundated several cities, submerged crops, and damaged numerous roads. Major arterial roads to and from Ponce were blocked by floodwater and landslide debris. Some portions of Puerto Rico Highway 3 were submerged by water from both the torrential rain and wave action. Damage from Frederic in Puerto Rico reached at least US$5 million, though northwestern Puerto Rico sustained minimal damage from the storm. In St. Thomas, four small homes were destroyed by flooding, and an additional 50 sustained at least partial damage. One waterspout was reported off the coast, but did no damage. Normally dry coastal guts in St. Croix filled with floodwater from Frederic, damaging homes and other buildings in five communities on St. Croix. Culverts, bridges, and heavy beach erosion resulted from rough surf off the coast of the island. The floods generated various sewage problems. Damage in Virgin Islands was estimated to be at least US$5 million.

=== Hispaniola and Cuba ===
Heavy rains buffeted the islands of Hispaniola and Cuba for several days as a disorganized Frederic tracked over the Greater Antilles. As with Puerto Rico and the Lesser Antilles, rain fell on grounds still saturated by the recent passage of Hurricane David. In Guantánamo on Cuba's eastern Atlantic coast, at least 6.88 in (175 mm) of rainfall was reported. Frederic continued to produce strong winds even as a weak tropical depression south of Cuba, as sustained winds of 46 mph (74 km/h) were clocked in Santa Cruz del Sur on September 7. However, damage from Frederic in Hispaniola and eastern Cuba remained minimal.

Frederic's landfall on western Cuba as a redeveloped tropical cyclone was much more significant than its first Cuban landfall. Sustained winds peaked at 52 mph (84 km/h) in Bahía Honda, Cuba on September 10. Despite recent renovations at José Martí International Airport, the lack of a proper drainage system allowed rainfall to inundate the airport, stranding several heads of state that were scheduled to hold a summit and disrupting air traffic to and from the airport for an entire week. Heavy rains triggered numerous landslides, causing severe damage to infrastructure and over 250 dwellings. Areas at risk for additional landslide activity were declared inhospitable, resulting in the evacuation of 1,200 people. Rainfall estimates in Cuba peaked at 5 in (130 mm).

=== United States ===
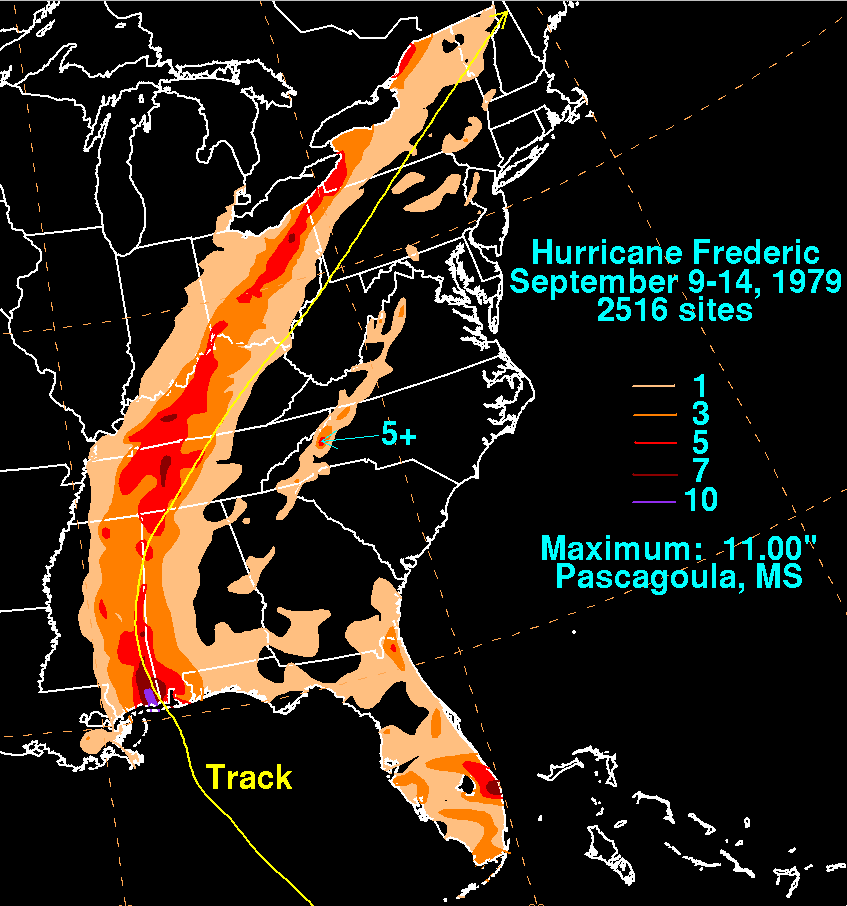
Rainfall totals from Hurricane Frederic through September 9-14

Storm surge damage was reported along 80 miles of coastline from Mississippi to Florida, with tides 8 to 12 feet (2.4 to 3.7 m) above the normal level being observed. Frederic inundated 122,000 acres of land across Florida, Mississippi, and Alabama. Five deaths were directly attributed to Frederic in the United States, four of which occurred inland: a person swept from a boat near Pensacola was the only casualty along the coast. Total losses due to Frederic in the continental United States were estimated at $2.22 billion. Frederic also dumped heavy rainfall across much of the eastern United States, and over a dozen tornadoes were reported in the storm's wake.

==== Florida ====
As Frederic was strengthening in the Gulf of Mexico, strong winds were reported in the Florida Keys. A station on the Dry Tortugas recorded a 58 mph (93 km/h) wind gust on September 10. A station in Key West, Florida clocked a 43 mph (69 km/h) wind gust and sustained winds of 29 mph (47 km/h). The highest wind gust recorded in the state was 96 mph (154 km/h), recorded at the Pensacola Naval Air Station. Another station in Pensacola recorded a gust to 78 mph (126 km/h). Tides in the Dry Tortugas peaked at 15 ft (4.6 m), roughly 12 ft (3.7 m) above normal. Water reached heights of 11–15 ft (3.4–4.6 m) along Perdido Key. In the Pensacola area, storm surge peaked at 6–7 ft (1.8–2.1 m). Surge above 3 ft (0.91 m) reached as far east as Panama City. Rainfall from the extremities of the hurricane reached South Florida, with some rainfall totals exceeding 7 in (180 mm). Damage in Florida was estimated to be about $75.3 million, the overwhelming majority of it in Escambia and Santa Rosa counties. Florida recorded 1 death and 106 injuries in association with Frederic.

==== Alabama ====
Frederic made two landfalls in Alabama, first on Dauphin island and then on the mainland near Bayou La Batre an hour later. Frederic brought strong winds and significant storm surge to coastal Alabama. Tidal flooding inundated nearly 87,000 acres (350 km^{2}) of land in the state. At Dauphin Island, storm surge ranged from 9 ft (2.7 m) on the eastern end of the island to 13 ft (4.0 m) midpoint of the island. No high water marks were available to estimate surge heights on the western end of the island, which was completely washed over by surge. On the mainland, surge along the coast of Baldwin County ranged from 10–15 ft (3.0–4.6 m), with a peak water level of 15.79 ft (4.81 m) measured in a building at Gulf State Park. Surge along the shores of Mobile Bay generally ranged from 6 to 12 ft (1.8 to 3.7 m), with water levels of 12 ft (3.7 m) and 13.5 ft (4.1 m) recorded near the mouth of the Mobile River and Cedar Point Pier, respectively. Further inland, an industrial plant on the Mobile River reported a gauge reading 5.5 ft (1.7 m) above normal water levels. The strongest winds in Alabama in association with Frederic were recorded near Dauphin Island, with an anemometer on the Dauphin Island Bridge reporting a peak gust of 146 mph (235 km/h). An instrument at the Dauphin Island Sea Lab recorded a gust to 137 mph (220 km/h) before failing. Dauphin Island Sea Lab also recorded the lowest reliable pressure on land, with a minimum value of 943 mbar (27.8 inHg). The Mobile airport reported a peak gust of 97 mph (156 km/h) and the Mobile County Civil Defense office reported a peak gust of 101 mph (163 km/h). Elsewhere in Alabama, Frederic produced gusts of tropical storm-force well inland, with a maximum gust of 52 mph (84 km/h) at Huntsville. One tornado was reported in the state, which destroyed a mobile home in Grove Hill.

The Mobile district of the Army Corps of Engineers estimated total damage in Alabama to be about $1.383 billion. Throughout the state, Frederic damaged or destroyed 128,900 residences, 10,415 commercial buildings, 258 industrial buildings, and 872 government facilities. Frederic destroyed an estimated 12,000 acres (49 km^{2}) acres of pecan trees, causing a loss of $1.143 million to the 1979 harvest. Total agricultural damage in the state, including losses of livestock, was estimated at $61.594 million. An estimated 2.626 billion board-feet of lumber was damaged by the storm.There were 10 deaths in Alabama associated with Frederic, all of them in Mobile county. Additionally, 3,483 people in the state were injured as a result of the storm, with 122 requiring hospitalization.

Storm surge from Frederic caused severe beach and dune erosion on Dauphin Island, with the entire southern shoreline receding from 10 to 100 feet. On the eastern end of the island, the dune line was eroded by 30 feet horizontally and 2 feet vertically. About 1,000 residences on the island were damaged, with 144 severely damaged or destroyed. 15 commercial buildings were damaged or destroyed, and several buildings at Dauphin Island Sea Lab were damaged. In the city of Mobile, the Red Cross estimated that over 15,000 homes suffered damage, with 174 being destroyed. High winds tore apart the roof of Mobile city hall. Bellingrath Gardens and Home sustained significant damage, with 3,000 trees on the property being destroyed. In Washington County, the storm blew out windows, knocked down trees and signs, disrupted electrical service, and caused roof and water damage to county schools.

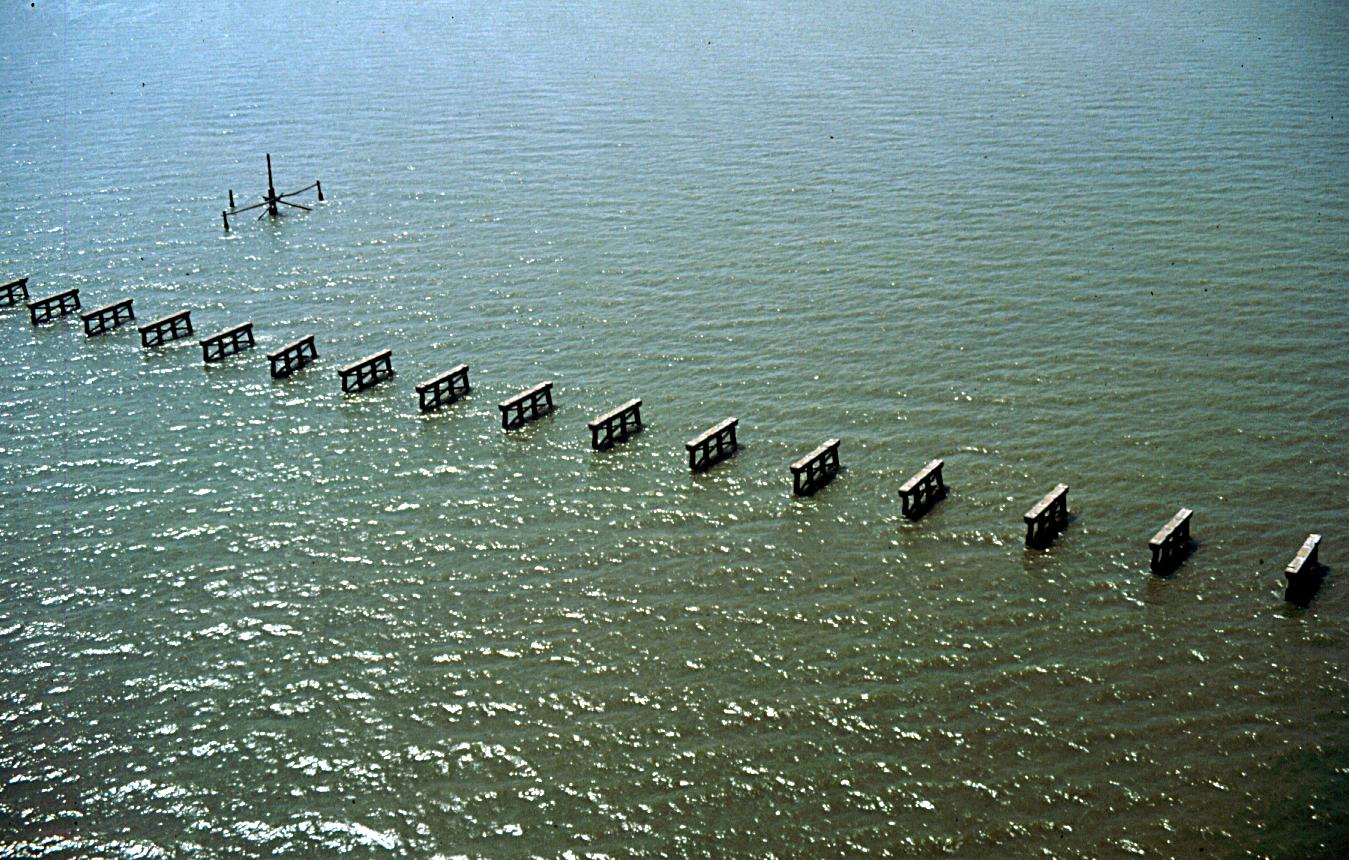
The Dauphin Island Bridge was destroyed by Hurricane Frederic, making the island only reachable by boat.

==== Mississippi ====
After making landfall near the state's border with Alabama, Frederic moved through Mississippi. An anemometer at Ingalls Shipyard at Pascagoula recorded a peak gust of 128 mph (206 km/h), the highest wind in the state associated with Frederic. Pascagoula civil defense recorded a maximum gust of 115 mph (185 km/h) before their equipment failed. Elsewhere on the coast, Keesler AFB reported a maximum wind gust of 98 mph (158 km/h), and a station in Bay St. Louis reported a maximum gust of 74 mph (119 km/h). Further inland, Poplarville recorded a gust to 100 mph (160 km/h) before their equipment failed, Laurel reported a gust of 83 mph (134 km/h), and the weather office in Meridian reported a gust of 69 mph (111 km/h). The highest reported storm surge height in the state was 5.78 ft (1.76 m) at Pascagoula.

Total damage in Mississippi was estimated at $569 million. Two people were killed in the state, both in Pearl River County. Across the state, 811 million board feet of timber suffered damage, nearly half of it in Jackson County. An estimated 62,100 residences were damaged in Mississippi, as well as 3,425 commercial buildings. High winds damaged several buildings at Keesler AFB, mainly roofs and windows. Water damage due to rain entering damaged structures was also noted. Damage to the base totaled $11.355 million.

=== Canada ===
Frederic dropped heavy rain across Canada as an extratropical storm, peaking at 137 mm (5.4 in) near Ottawa, Ontario. Record precipitation was recorded at the J. S. Marshall Radar Observatory in Sainte-Anne-de-Bellevue, Quebec, which documented 77 mm (3.0 in) of rain on September 15. Rainfall spread as far northeast as the eastern coast of Labrador. Flooding occurred in eastern Ontario and portions of the Niagara Peninsula, as noted in Cornwall. In Toronto, the rains led to a seven-car traffic collision and a separate car accident that injured two. Flooding also took place in southern Quebec, with floodwater submerging streets, basements, and underground parking lots in Montreal. Damage from southern Quebec reached C$8.238 million (US$7.095 million).

== Aftermath ==
On September 13, President Jimmy Carter issued disaster declarations for Florida, Alabama, and Mississippi. In Gulf Shores, FEMA purchased several oceanfront lots damaged by Frederic, converting the area into a public beach. Keesler AFB deployed 1724 troops to aid in cleanup efforts.

=== Retirement ===
Because of extensive destruction caused by the hurricane, the name Frederic was retired by the World Meteorological Organization in the spring of 1980, and it will not be used again to name a tropical system in the North Atlantic. It was replaced with Fabian for the 1985 season.

== See also ==
- List of Category 4 Atlantic hurricanes
- List of Alabama hurricanes
- List of Mississippi hurricanes
- List of wettest tropical cyclones in Cuba
