= List of off-season Atlantic hurricanes =

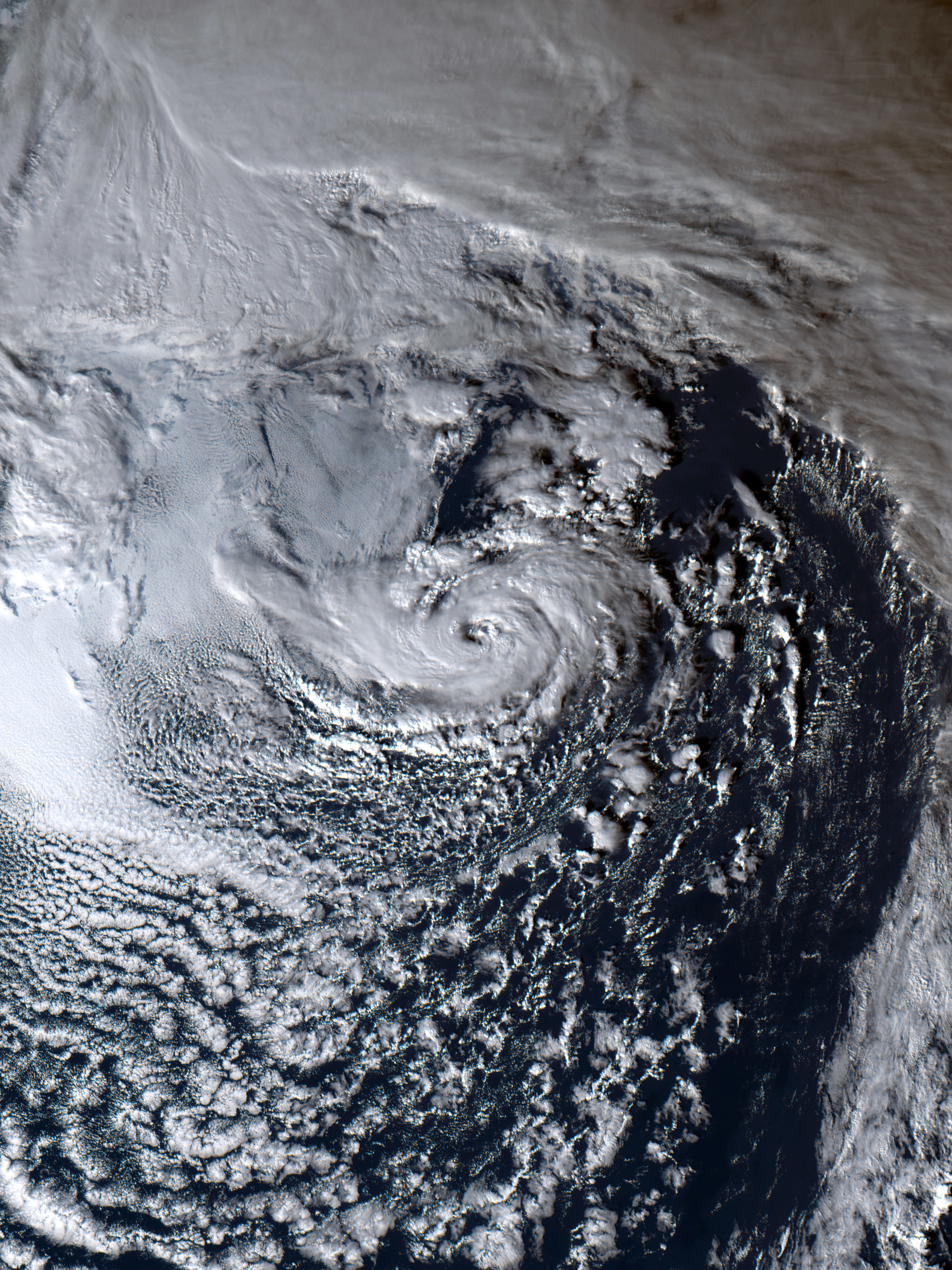
Satellite image of the most recent Atlantic off-season system, an unnamed subtropical storm on January 16, 2023

An off-season Atlantic hurricane is a tropical or subtropical cyclone that existed in the Atlantic basin outside of the official Atlantic hurricane season. The National Oceanic and Atmospheric Administration currently defines the season as occurring between June 1 and November 30 each calendar year, which is when 97% of all Atlantic tropical cyclones occur. Peak activity is known to be between August and October. Between 1938, when the United States Weather Bureau began issuing tropical cyclone warnings as a collaborative observation network for cities along the U.S. coastline, and 1963, the season was defined between June 15 and November 15. In 1964, the season was extended to begin on June 1 and end on November 30, which remains the official length of the season.

As of 2023, there have been 92 off-season cyclones recorded in the official Atlantic hurricane database, which dates back to 1851. In addition, six earlier such storms have been documented, but are not part of the database. The first off-season storm in the database was an 1865 storm that developed in the Caribbean Sea; an earlier documented 1863 hurricane is not part of the database. The most recent off-season system was an unnamed January subtropical storm in 2023.

== Background ==
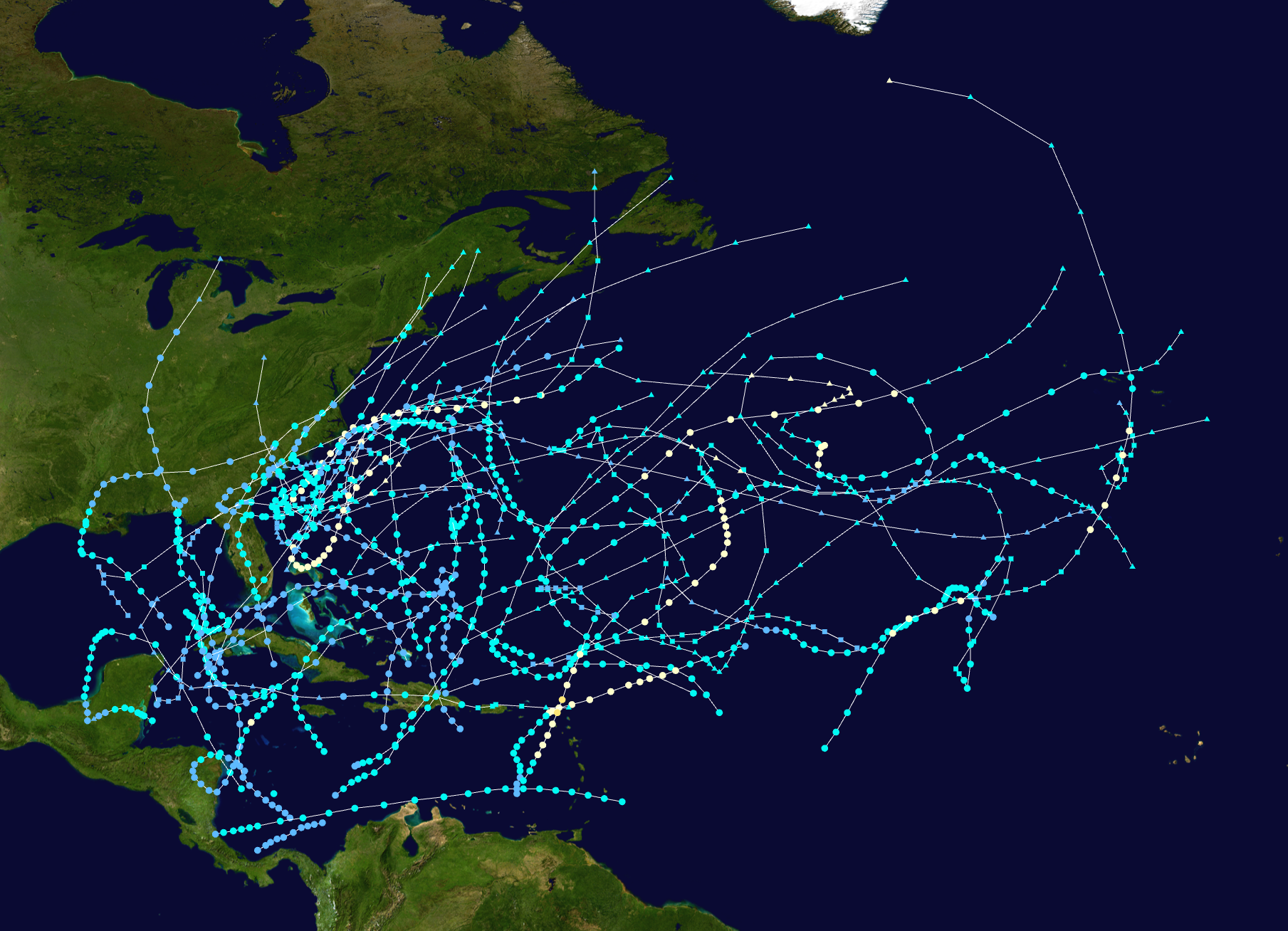
Tracks of all known storms that formed during the off-season between 1851 and 2023.

Off-season storms are most likely to occur in May, with approximately 60% of such storms occurring during that month. Off-season cyclones are most likely to develop in the central to western Atlantic Ocean, and most do not make landfall. Of the storms that have, a tropical storm in 1948 that struck the Dominican Republic, killing 80 people in the Dominican Republic, was the deadliest. However, the unofficial hurricane in 1863 killed 110 people, in a shipwreck off Florida and on land. That same storm was estimated to have reached winds of 105 mph (169 km/h), making it the strongest hurricane between December and May; the strongest currently in the official database was a March hurricane in 1908 that reached winds of 100 mph (160 km/h). In addition, the strongest off-season cyclone to make landfall in the United States was Tropical Storm Beryl in May of 2012, which made landfall near Jacksonville Beach, Florida with 65 mph (105 km/h) winds. Hurricane Alice was the only one to officially make a landfall as a hurricane, doing so to islands in the northern Lesser Antilles; it caused locally heavy rainfall and moderate damage. However, 1822 Martinique–Venezuela hurricane also did so unofficially in both the Lesser Antilles and Venezuela. Of all cyclones during the off-season, Hurricane Lili in 1984 lasted the longest, for a total of 12 days. In 2005, Hurricane Epsilon maintained hurricane status for five days, longer than any other storm in December; the previous record was two and a half days, set by Hurricane Lili.

The year with the most off-season storms was 1887, with a total of five. The 1951 season had four, one of which a depression. Several others had three tropical cyclones, of which only 2003 had three tropical storms. The 1908 and 1951 seasons were the only ones with two hurricanes forming in the off-season. In eight seasons, there were storms both prior to the start of the season as well as after the season ended, those being 1887, 1911, 1951, 1953, 1954, 1970, 2003, and 2007; all but 1911 had tropical cyclones of at least tropical storm status before and after the season. The longest streak of consecutive years featuring at least one pre-season storm was seven, from 2015 through 2021.

== Chronology ==
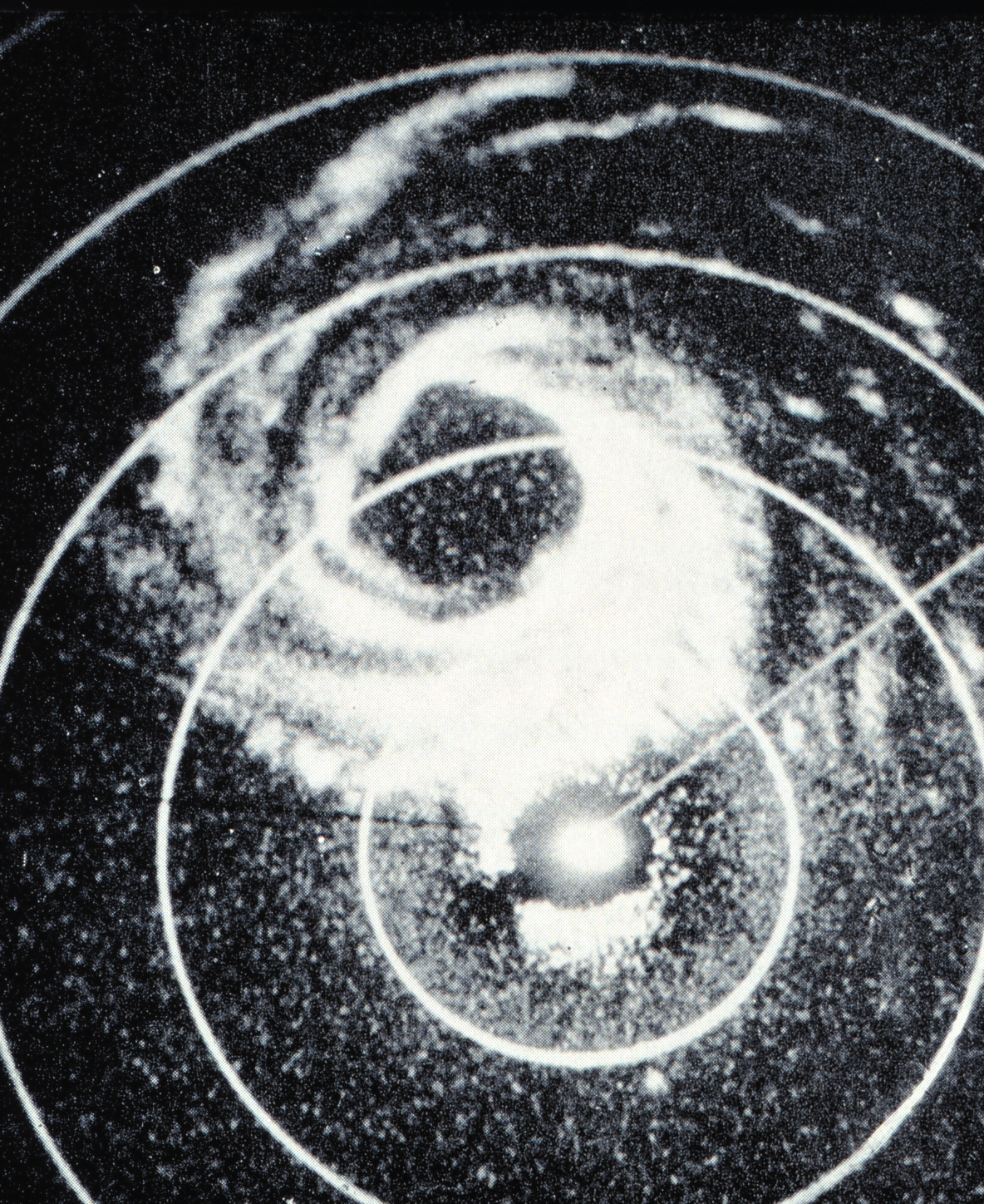
Radar image of Hurricane Alice in 1955, the first recorded North Atlantic hurricane to span two calendar years.

Tropical cyclones have been named in the Atlantic since the 1947 Atlantic hurricane season, and subtropical cyclones have been recognized in HURDAT since 1968. The National Hurricane Center issues names for tropical and subtropical cyclones once their winds reach 39 mph (63 km/h). Before 1950, storms were numbered based on their appearance in the Atlantic hurricane database; tropical depressions were unnumbered. Storms before 1851 are unofficial and are not part of the official Atlantic hurricane best track. In addition, a hurricane from May 1863, labeled "Amanda", is included after being rediscovered in 2013.

The wind speeds listed are maximum one-minute average sustained winds, and the pressure is the minimum barometric pressure; tropical cyclones listed with N/A under pressure indicates there is no known estimated pressure. For deaths, "None" indicates that there were no reports of fatalities; death tolls listed as "several" mean there were fatalities reported, but an exact total is unavailable. For both deaths and damage, N/A refers to no known total, although such storms may have impacted land. The damage totals are the United States dollar of the year of the storm.

Name	Dates	Peak intensity			Areas affected	Damage (USD)	Deaths	Ref(s).
Name	Dates	Category	Wind speed	Pressure	Areas affected	Damage (USD)	Deaths	Ref(s).
Unnamed	May 23–24, 1771	Tropical storm	≥40 mph (64 km/h)	Not specified	Cuba	N/A	None	
Unnamed	May 25–26, 1779	Tropical storm	≥40 mph (64 km/h)	Not specified	Cuba	N/A	None	
Unnamed	May 28, 1794	Tropical storm	≥40 mph (64 km/h)	Not specified	Cuba	N/A	None	
"Martinique–Venezuela"	December 13–22, 1822	Category 1 hurricane	≥75 mph (121 km/h)	Not specified	Eastern Caribbean, Venezuela	Unknown	65–105	
Unnamed	May 28 – June 5, 1825	Category 1 hurricane	≥75 mph (121 km/h)	Not specified	Cuba, United States East Coast	Unknown	7	
Unnamed	May 20–21, 1838	Tropical storm	≥40 mph (64 km/h)	Not specified	Jamaica	N/A	None	
"Amanda"	May 24–29, 1863	Category 2 hurricane	105 mph (169 km/h)	975 hPa (28.79 inHg)	Florida	Unknown	110	
One	May 30, 1865	Tropical storm	60 mph (97 km/h)	Not specified	Caribbean Sea	N/A	None	
Twelve	November 25 – December 2, 1878	Tropical storm	70 mph (110 km/h)	Not specified	Lesser Antilles, Puerto Rico, Jamaica	N/A	None	
One	May 15–18, 1887	Tropical storm	70 mph (110 km/h)	≤997 hPa (29.44 inHg)	Atlantic Canada	N/A	None	
Two	May 17–21, 1887	Tropical storm	60 mph (97 km/h)	≤1,002 hPa (29.59 inHg)	Jamaica, Cuba, Bahamas	N/A	None	
Seventeen	November 27 – December 4, 1887	Category 1 hurricane	80 mph (130 km/h)	Not specified	Bahamas	N/A	None	
Eighteen	December 4–8, 1887	Category 1 hurricane	80 mph (130 km/h)	Not specified	Central Atlantic Ocean	N/A	None	
Nineteen	December 7–12, 1887	Tropical storm	60 mph (97 km/h)	Not specified	Lesser Antilles, Colombia, Nicaragua	N/A	None	
One	May 16–21, 1889	Category 1 hurricane	80 mph (130 km/h)	Not specified	Western Atlantic Ocean	N/A	None	
One	May 27–29, 1890	Tropical storm	60 mph (97 km/h)	Not specified	Cuba	N/A	4	
Unnamed	May 1–6, 1899	Tropical depression	25 mph (40 km/h)	1,010 hPa (29.83 inHg)	Haiti, Cuba	N/A	None	
Unnamed	January 17–19, 1900	Tropical depression	35 mph (56 km/h)	Not specified	Central Atlantic Ocean	N/A	None	
One	March 6–9, 1908	Category 2 hurricane	100 mph (160 km/h)	<984 hPa (29.06 inHg)	Leeward Islands	N/A	1	
Two	May 24–31, 1908	Category 1 hurricane	75 mph (121 km/h)	989 hPa (29.21 inHg)	North Carolina	N/A	None	
Unnamed	February 19–21, 1911	Tropical depression	35 mph (56 km/h)	1,009 hPa (29.80 inHg)	Central Atlantic Ocean	N/A	None	
Unnamed	May 22–24, 1911	Tropical depression	35 mph (56 km/h)	Not specified	Central Atlantic Ocean	N/A	None	
Unnamed	December 11–13, 1911	Tropical depression	35 mph (56 km/h)	1,005 hPa (29.68 inHg)	Haiti, Cuba	N/A	None	
Unnamed	April 14–16, 1912	Tropical depression	35 mph (56 km/h)	Not specified	Central Atlantic	N/A	None	
Unnamed	May 5–8, 1913	Tropical depression	35 mph (56 km/h)	1,003 hPa (29.62 inHg)	Northern Atlantic Ocean	N/A	None	
Unnamed	April 29 – May 2, 1915	Tropical depression	35 mph (56 km/h)	1,003 hPa (29.62 inHg)	Central Atlantic Ocean	N/A	None	
One	May 13 – 16, 1916	Tropical storm	60 mph (95 km/h)	990 hPa (29.23 inHg)	Cuba, United States East Coast	N/A	None	
Unnamed	May 12–15, 1922	Tropical depression	35 mph (56 km/h)	1,008 hPa (29.77 inHg)	Nicaragua	N/A	None	
Four	November 27 – December 1, 1925	Tropical storm	65 mph (105 km/h)	995 hPa (29.38 inHg)	Cuba, United States East Coast; Bermuda, Azores	$3 million	73	
One	May 5–11, 1932	Tropical storm	65 mph (105 km/h)	995 hPa (29.38 inHg)	Dominican Republic	N/A	None	
One	May 14–19, 1933	Tropical storm	50 mph (80 km/h)	1,001 hPa (29.56 inHg))	Yucatán Peninsula	N/A	None	
One	May 15–18, 1935	Tropical storm	60 mph (97 km/h)	1,003 hPa (29.62 inHg)	Hispaniola	N/A	None	
Unnamed	May 21–26, 1936	Tropical depression	35 mph (56 km/h)	Not specified	Texas	N/A	None	
Seventeen	December 4–6, 1936	Tropical storm	65 mph (105 km/h)	996 hPa (29.41 inHg)	Eastern Atlantic Ocean	N/A	None	
One	January 3–6, 1938	Category 1 hurricane	80 mph (130 km/h)	992 hPa (29.29 inHg)	Eastern Atlantic Ocean	N/A	None	
One	May 19–24, 1940	Tropical storm	65 mph (105 km/h)	<996 hPa (29.41 inHg)	Western Atlantic Ocean	N/A	None	
One	May 22–28, 1948	Tropical storm	50 mph (80 km/h)	1,004 hPa (29.65 inHg)	Dominican Republic	N/A	80	
One	January 4–9, 1951	Tropical storm	65 mph (105 km/h)	997 hPa (29.44 inHg)	Western Atlantic Ocean	N/A	None	
Able	May 16–24, 1951	Category 1 hurricane	90 mph (140 km/h)	973 hPa (28.73 inHg)	Bahamas, North Carolina	N/A	None	
Unnamed	May 17–18, 1951	Tropical depression	35 mph (56 km/h)	1008 hPa (29.77 inHg)	Western Atlantic Ocean	N/A	None	
Twelve	December 7–10, 1951	Category 1 hurricane	80 mph (130 km/h)	995 hPa (29.38 inHg)	Azores	N/A	None	
One	February 2–3, 1952	Tropical storm	70 mph (110 km/h)	990 hPa (29.23 inHg))	Florida	N/A	None	
Alice	May 25 – June 7, 1953	Tropical storm	70 mph (110 km/h)	994 hPa (29.35 inHg)	Cuba, Florida	N/A	6	
Irene	December 7–9, 1953	Tropical storm	65 mph (105 km/h)	≤999 hPa (29.50 inHg)	Central Atlantic Ocean	N/A	None	
Unnamed	December 13–14, 1953	Tropical depression	35 mph (56 km/h)	Not specified	Lesser Antilles	N/A	None	
Unnamed	January 27–28, 1954	Subtropical depression	35 mph (56 km/h)	1,010 hPa (29.83 inHg)	Central Atlantic Ocean	N/A	None	
Unnamed	May 19–25, 1954	Subtropical depression	35 mph (56 km/h)	1,010 hPa (29.83 inHg)	Northeastern Atlantic Ocean	N/A	None	
One	May 28–30, 1954	Tropical storm	50 mph (80 km/h)	≤997 hPa (29.44 inHg))	North Carolina	N/A	None	
Alice	December 30, 1954 – January 6, 1955	Category 1 hurricane	90 mph (140 km/h)	980 hPa (28.94 inHg)	Lesser Antilles	$623,000	None	
One	May 25–27, 1958	Tropical storm	60 mph (97 km/h)	999 hPa (29.50 inHg)	Western Atlantic Ocean	N/A	None	
Arlene	May 28–31, 1959	Tropical storm	65 mph (105 km/h)	993 hPa (29.32 inHg)	United States Gulf Coast	$500,000	1	
Unnamed	April 30, 1962	Tropical depression	35 mph (56 km/h)	Not specified	Western Atlantic Ocean	N/A	None	
Ten	November 28 – December 4, 1962	Category 1 hurricane	90 mph (140 km/h)	988 hPa (29.18 inHg)	Southeastern United States	N/A	None	
Ten	November 29 – December 2, 1965	Tropical storm	50 mph (80 km/h)	999 hPa (29.50 inHg)	Western Atlantic Ocean	N/A	None	
Alma	May 17–27, 1970	Category 1 hurricane	80 mph (130 km/h)	993 hPa (29.32 inHg)	Cuba, Florida	N/A	8	
Unnamed	November 28 - December 1, 1970	Tropical storm	65 mph (105 km/h)	987 hPa (29.15 inHg)	Western Atlantic Ocean	N/A	None	
Alpha	May 23–29, 1972	Subtropical storm	70 mph (110 km/h)	991 hPa (29.26 inHg)	Southeastern United States	$100,000	2	
Unnamed	April 18–21, 1973	Tropical depression	30 mph (48 km/h)	Not specified	Central Atlantic Ocean	None	None	
Unnamed	May 2–5, 1973	Tropical depression	30 mph (48 km/h)	Not specified	Central Atlantic Ocean	None	None	
Unnamed	May 19–20, 1974	Tropical depression	30 mph (48 km/h)	Not specified	Belize, Mexico, Cuba; Jamaica, United States Gulf Coast	N/A	None	
Unnamed	December 9–13, 1975	Subtropical storm	70 mph (110 km/h)	985 hPa (29.09 inHg)	Northeast Atlantic Ocean	N/A	None	
One	May 21–25, 1976	Subtropical storm	50 mph (80 km/h)	994 hPa (29.35 inHg)	Florida	N/A	None	
Unnamed	January 18–23, 1978	Subtropical storm	45 mph (72 km/h)	1,002 hPa (29.59 inHg)	Central Atlantic Ocean	N/A	None	
Arlene	May 6–9, 1981	Tropical storm	60 mph (97 km/h)	999 hPa (29.50 inHg)	Cuba, Bahamas	N/A	None	
Lili	December 12–24, 1984	Category 1 hurricane	80 mph (130 km/h)	980 hPa (28.94 inHg)	Hispaniola	N/A	None	
Unnamed	December 7–9, 1985	Tropical depression	35 mph (56 km/h)	Not specified	Western Caribbean	N/A	None	
Unnamed	May 24 – June 1, 1987	Tropical depression	35 mph (56 km/h)	1,011 hPa (29.85 inHg)	Bahamas	N/A	None	
Unnamed	May 31 – June 2, 1988	Tropical depression	35 mph (56 km/h)	1,004 hPa (29.65 inHg)	Cuba	N/A	37	
Karen	November 28 – December 4, 1989	Tropical storm	60 mph (97 km/h)	1,000 hPa (29.53 inHg)	Cuba	N/A	None	
Unnamed	May 24–27, 1990	Tropical depression	35 mph (56 km/h)	1,007 hPa (29.74 inHg)	Cuba, Florida	None	None	
One	April 21–24, 1992	Subtropical storm	50 mph (80 km/h)	1,002 hPa (29.59 inHg)	Central Atlantic Ocean	None	None	
Unnamed	May 31 – June 3, 1993	Tropical depression	35 mph (56 km/h)	999 hPa (29.50 inHg)	Cuba, Florida	None	20	
Nicole	November 24 – December 1, 1998	Category 1 hurricane	85 mph (137 km/h)	979 hPa (28.91 inHg)	Northeastern Atlantic Ocean	None	None	
Olga	November 24 – December 6, 2001	Category 1 hurricane	90 mph (140 km/h)	973 hPa (28.73 inHg)	Western Atlantic Ocean	None	None	
Ana	April 20–24, 2003	Tropical storm	60 mph (97 km/h)	994 hPa (29.35 inHg)	Florida	None	2	
Odette	December 4–7, 2003	Tropical storm	65 mph (105 km/h)	993 hPa (29.32 inHg)	Hispaniola	$8 million	10	
Peter	December 7–11, 2003	Tropical storm	70 mph (110 km/h)	990 hPa (29.23 inHg)	Eastern Atlantic Ocean	None	None	
Otto	November 29 – December 3, 2004	Tropical storm	50 mph (80 km/h)	995 hPa (29.38 inHg)	Central Atlantic Ocean	None	None	
Epsilon	November 29 – December 8, 2005	Category 1 hurricane	85 mph (137 km/h)	981 hPa (28.97 inHg)	Central Atlantic Ocean	None	None	
Zeta	December 30, 2005 – January 7, 2006	Tropical storm	65 mph (105 km/h)	994 hPa (29.35 inHg)	Central Atlantic Ocean	None	None	
Andrea	May 9–11, 2007	Subtropical storm	60 mph (97 km/h)	1,001 hPa (29.56 inHg)	Southeast United States coast	Minimal	6	
Olga	December 11–12, 2007	Tropical storm	60 mph (97 km/h)	1,003 hPa (29.62 inHg)	Greater Antilles	$45 million	40	
Arthur	May 31 – June 2, 2008	Tropical storm	45 mph (72 km/h)	1,004 hPa (29.65 inHg)	Belize, Yucatán Peninsula	$78 million	9	
Unnamed	May 28–29, 2009	Tropical depression	35 mph (56 km/h)	1,006 hPa (29.71 inHg)	Western Atlantic Ocean	None	None	
Alberto	May 19–22, 2012	Tropical storm	60 mph (97 km/h)	995 hPa (29.38 inHg)	South Carolina, North Carolina, Georgia	Minimal	None	
Beryl	May 26–30, 2012	Tropical storm	70 mph (110 km/h)	992 hPa (29.29 inHg)	Florida, Georgia, Cuba, The Bahamas	$148,000	3	
Unnamed	December 5–7, 2013	Subtropical storm	50 mph (80 km/h)	997 hPa (29.44 inHg)	Azores	None	None	
Ana	May 8–11, 2015	Tropical storm	60 mph (97 km/h)	998 hPa (29.47 inHg)	Southeastern United States	Minimal	2	
Alex	January 12–15, 2016	Category 1 hurricane	85 mph (137 km/h)	981 hPa (29.0 inHg)	Bermuda, Azores	Minimal	1	
Bonnie	May 27 – June 4, 2016	Tropical storm	45 mph (72 km/h)	1,006 hPa (29.71 inHg)	Southeastern United States, The Bahamas	$640,000	2	
Arlene	April 19–21, 2017	Tropical storm	50 mph (80 km/h)	990 hPa (29.23 inHg)	Central Atlantic Ocean	None	None	
Alberto	May 25–31, 2018	Tropical storm	65 mph (105 km/h)	990 hPa (29.23 inHg)	Yucatán Peninsula, Cuba, Southeastern United States	$125 million	18	
Andrea	May 20–21, 2019	Subtropical storm	40 mph (64 km/h)	1,006 hPa (29.71 inHg)	Bermuda	None	None	
Arthur	May 16–19, 2020	Tropical storm	60 mph (97 km/h)	991 hPa (29.26 inHg)	Florida, Bahamas, North Carolina, Bermuda	$112,000	None	
Bertha	May 27–28, 2020	Tropical storm	50 mph (80 km/h)	1,004 hPa (29.65 inHg)	The Bahamas, Florida, Georgia, The Carolinas, Virginia, West Virginia, Pennsylvania	$133,000	None	
Ana	May 22–24, 2021	Tropical storm	45 mph (72 km/h)	1,006 hPa (29.71 inHg)	Bermuda	None	None	
Unnamed	January 16–17, 2023	Subtropical storm	70 mph (110 km/h)	976 hPa (28.82 inHg)	New England, Atlantic Canada	None	None	

=== Systems by month ===
Off-season storms are most likely to occur in May, followed by December. Several late November systems have persisted into December thus enhancing its count. Conversely, only one storm has formed in March, followed by February with two. Additionally, a pair of hurricanes have spanned two calendar years: Hurricane Alice in 1954–1955, and Tropical Storm Zeta in 2005–2006.

Number of recorded off-season cyclones by month
Month	Number of cyclones
December	28(Includes 11 that formed in November)
January	7
February	2
March	1
April	7
May	50

== See also ==
- List of off-season Australian region tropical cyclones
- List of off-season Pacific hurricanes
- List of off-season South Pacific tropical cyclones
- List of off-season South-West Indian Ocean tropical cyclones
