= List of shipwrecks in March 1863 =

The list of shipwrecks in March 1863 includes ships sunk, foundered, grounded, or otherwise lost during March 1863.

== 2 March ==
List of shipwrecks: 2 March 1863
Ship	State	Description
Atalanta	United States	The 141-ton sternwheel paddle steamer struck a bridge on the Cumberland River at Clarksville, Tennessee, Confederate States of America. The impact caused her cabin to separate from her hull.
Ceylon	United Kingdom	The ship ran aground in Southampton Water. She was on a voyage from Calcutta, India to Southampton, Hampshire. She was refloated the next day.
John A. Parks	United States	American Civil War. CSS Alabama's South Atlantic Expeditionary Raid: The 1,047-ton full-rigged ship, on a voyage from Hallowell, Maine, to Montevideo, Uruguay, and Buenos Aires, Argentina, carrying a cargo of white pine lumber, was captured and burned by the screw sloop-of-war CSS Alabama (Confederate States Navy) in the North Atlantic Ocean (29°15′N 38°20′W).
Lady Brown	(United Kingdom of Great Britain and Ireland) New South Wales	The cutter was wrecked at Brisbane, Queensland.

== 4 March ==
List of shipwrecks: 4 March 1863
Ship	State	Description
Digby	United Kingdom	The full-rigged ship was wrecked on the Colorado Reefs, off the coast of Cuba. She was on a voyage from Liverpool, Lancashire to Nassau, Bahamas.
Frederick Greff	United States Army	The 46-ton sidewheel paddle steamer exploded.
Ida	Confederate States of America	American Civil War, Union blockade: Pursued by the schooner USS James S. Chambers (United States Navy) while attempting to run the Union blockade with a cargo of liquor, the schooner was beached by her crew at Sanibel Island, Florida, after which the crew of James S. Chambers destroyed her.

== 5 March ==
List of shipwrecks: 5 March 1863
Ship	State	Description
City of Peterborough	United Kingdom	The ship collided with the barque Tuspan (France) about 200 nautical miles (370 km) south of the Isles of Scilly. There were five dead and eight survivors
Czarina	United Kingdom	The ship was abandoned in the Atlantic Ocean. She was on a voyage from Cárdenas, Cuba to Queenstown, County Cork.
Josephine	Confederate States of America	American Civil War, Union blockade: The sloop, attempting to run the Union blockade, ran aground near Fort Morgan, Alabama while trying to evade the gunboat USS Aroostook and screw steamer USS Pocahontas (both United States Navy). Aroostook and Pocahontas then destroyed her with gunfire.

== 6 March ==
List of shipwrecks: 6 March 1863
Ship	State	Description
Ernestine Leon	France	The schooner was wrecked at Mogador, Morocco.
Star of Peace	United States	American Civil War: The 941-ton clipper, bound from Calcutta, India to Boston, Massachusetts, with a cargo of hides and 1,000 tons of saltpeter, was captured and burned in the Atlantic Ocean by the screw sloop-of-war CSS Florida (Confederate States Navy).

== 7 March ==
List of shipwrecks: 7 March 1863
Ship	State	Description
Germaine	France	The brig ran aground on the Liberter Reef, off the coast of Finistère and sank. Her crew were rescued. She was on a voyage from Seaham, County Durham, United Kingdom to Brest.

== 8 March ==
List of shipwrecks: 8 March 1863
Ship	State	Description
Ivestone	United Kingdom	The ship sank at King's Lynn, Norfolk. She was on a voyage from Hartlepool, County Durham to King's Lynn. She was refloated on 4 April.
Perseverance	United Kingdom	The ship ran aground at Gibraltar. She was on a voyage from Safi, Morocco to London. She was refloated on 21 March.

== 9 March ==
List of shipwrecks: 9 March 1863
Ship	State	Description
Carrie	United Kingdom	The barque foundered in the Atlantic Ocean. A message in a bottle washed up at Beverly, Massachusetts in August stated the fact.
Gesina	Kingdom of Hanover	The ship was wrecked on St. Ninian's Isle, Shetland Islands, United Kingdom. Her crew were rescued. She was on a voyage from Hamburg to Memel, Prussia.
Mattapan	United States	The ship ran aground on the Ranka Fullah, in the Hooghly River. She was on a voyage from Calcutta, India to New York. She was refloated and put back to Calcutta in a severely leaky condition.

== 10 March ==
List of shipwrecks: 10 March 1863
Ship	State	Description
Marcellus	United Kingdom	The full-rigged ship ran aground on the English Bank, in the River Plate. She was on a voyage from Liverpool, Lancashire to Buenos Aires, Argentina. She was refloated with assistance from HMS Dotterel (Royal Navy).
Petee	Confederate States of America	American Civil War, Union blockade: The 6-ton sloop, attempting to run the Union blockade with a cargo of salt, was captured and destroyed off the Indian River Inlet, Florida, by the barque USS Gem of the Sea (United States Navy).
Phoenix	Norway	The brig ran aground at Aberdeen, United Kingdom. Her crew were rescued. She was on a voyage from Skien to Aberdeen. She was refloated and taken in to Aberdeen in a severely damaged condition.

== 11 March ==
List of shipwrecks: 11 March 1863
Ship	State	Description
Alabama	Flag unknown	The ship ran aground at Saint Vincent. She was refloated with assistance from USS Mohican and USS St. Louis (both United States Navy).
Den Gode Moder	Flag unknown	The schooner was wrecked at St. Andrews, Fife, United Kingdom.
Monitor	United Kingdom	The schooner was driven ashore in Broad Sound, Massachusetts, United States. She was on a voyage from Yarmouth, Nova Scotia, British North America to Boston, Massachusetts. She was refloated the next day with assistance from the steamship Fremont (United States).
Prince Consort	United Kingdom	The paddle steamer ran aground and was wrecked at Aberdeen. All 65 people on board were rescued. She was on a voyage from Edinburgh, Lothian to Aberdeen. The wreck was refloated on 21 April.

== 12 March ==
List of shipwrecks: 12 March 1863
Ship	State	Description
Cobden	United Kingdom	The ship was driven ashore at Poole, Dorset. She was on a voyage from Rotterdam, South Holland, Netherlands to Leeds, Yorkshire. She was refloated on 17 March and take in to Poole in a leaky condition.
Glenforth	United Kingdom	The ship was driven ashore at Lindisfarne, Northumberland. She was on a voyage from Grangemouth, Stirlingshire to Sunderland, County Durham. She was refloated on 21 March and taken in to Lindisfarne in a severely leaky condition.
Senator	United States	The 121-ton sidewheel paddle steamer was wrecked at the entrance to the harbour at San Pedro, California, with the loss of two lives.
Volumina	United Kingdom	The ship struck the Paternoster Rocks, in the Baltic Sea off the Swedish coast and sank. Her crew were rescued. She was on a voyage from Sunderland, County Durham to Swinemünde, Prussia.

== 13 March ==
List of shipwrecks: 13 March 1863
Ship	State	Description
Aldebaran	United States	American Civil War: The schooner, carrying a cargo of provisions and clocks, was captured and burned in the Atlantic Ocean at 29°18′N 51°04′W by the screw sloop-of-war CSS Florida (Confederate States Navy).
Anna Kimball	United Kingdom	The ship ran aground on the Diamond Harbour Sand, in the Hooghly river. She was on a voyage from Sydney, New South Wales to Calcutta, India. She was refloated on 19 March and taken in to Calcutta.
Buffon	France	The ship sprang a leak and was beached at "Penthouet", Loire-Inférieure.
Martha Elliott	United Kingdom	The barque was driven ashore and wrecked at Jaffa, Ottoman Syria.
CSS Natchez	Confederate States Navy	American Civil War: Confederate forces burned the 800-ton cottonclad gunboat on the Yazoo River in Mississippi 1 nautical mile (1.9 km) below Burtonia Landing and about 25 nautical miles (46 km) above Yazoo City, Mississippi, Confederate States of America, to prevent her capture by approaching United States Navy gunboats.
Thirty-fifth Parallel	Confederate States of America	American Civil War: The sidewheel paddle steamer, disabled since striking trees on 10 March, was burned by her crew on the Tallahatchie River in Mississippi to prevent her capture by the approaching ironclad gunboat USS Baron DeKalb and river gunboat USS Chillicothe (both United States Navy).

== 14 March ==
List of shipwrecks: 14 March 1863
Ship	State	Description
Ceres	Prussia	The brig was wrecked on Bornholm, Denmark. She was on a voyage from Danzig to Grimsby, Lincolnshire, United Kingdom.
Deux Beau Frères	France	The brig was driven ashore and wrecked at Mogador, Morocco.
Esther	France	The lugger was driven ashore at Brest, Finistère. She was on a voyage from Seaham, County Durham, United Kingdom to Brest.
Jemima	Confederate States of America	American Civil War, Union blockade: The 50-ton schooner was captured and destroyed on the York River at Milford Haven, Virginia, by boat crews from the armed screw steamer USS Crusader (United States Navy).
USS Mississippi	United States Navy	American Civil War, Battle of Port Hudson: The paddle frigate, heavily damaged and disabled by Confederate artillery fire, ran aground and was abandoned on the Mississippi River at Port Hudson, Louisiana, Confederate States of America. She floated back into the current, drifted downstream, and exploded violently when the flames reached her magazines.
Zeelandia	Netherlands	The East Indiaman ran aground on the Herd Sand, in the North Sea off the coast of County Durham, United Kingdom. She was refloated and taken in to North Shields, Northumberland, County Durham in a severely damaged condition.
Unidentified schooner	Confederate States of America	American Civil War, Union blockade: The schooner, a blockade runner in ballast, was captured and destroyed on the York River at Milford Haven, Virginia, by boat crews from the armed screw steamer USS Crusader (United States Navy).

== 15 March ==
List of shipwrecks: 15 March 1863
Ship	State	Description
Fanny Ann	United Kingdom	The schooner ran aground on Salt Island, Anglesey. She was on a voyage from Glasgow, Renfrewshire to Tralee, County Kerry. She was refloated the next day.
Lady Anne	United Kingdom	The ship was driven ashore and wrecked at Hartlepool, County Durham. She was on a voyage from King's Lynn, Norfolk to Hartlepool.
Laura	Kingdom of Hanover	The schooner was wrecked at Mogador, Morocco. She was on a voyage from London, United Kingdom to Mogador. She was condemned.
Mazeppa	United Kingdom	The brig was sighted in The Downs whilst on a voyage from Hartlepool to Bilbao, Spain. No further trace, presumed foundered with the loss of all hands.
Prinzesa	United Kingdom	Carrying US$140,000 in U.S. gold bullion and specie, the schooner foundered in shallow water off the northern end of Moreton Island off Redcliffe, Queensland.
Rocklight	United States	The ship ran aground on the Harbour Rock, off Queenstown, County Cork, United Kingdom. She was on a voyage from Callao, Peru to London. She was refloated and taken in to Queenstown in a leaky condition.

== 16 March ==
List of shipwrecks: 16 March 1863
Ship	State	Description
Frolic	United Kingdom	The sloop was driven ashore at Portsoy, Aberdeenshire. Both crew were rescued. She was on a voyage from Cullen, Moray to Portsoy.
Norton	Portugal	The brigantine foundered off Mogador, Morocco.
Trio	United Kingdom	The brig was wrecked at Margate, Kent. She was on a voyage from Sunderland, County Durham to Saint-Malo, Ille-et-Vilaine.

== 17 March ==
List of shipwrecks: 17 March 1863
Ship	State	Description
Frances	United Kingdom	The sloop sank on the Newport Sands, off Fishguard, Pembrokeshire. Her three crew were rescued.
Johanna Gezine	Kingdom of Hanover	The ship was driven ashore and wrecked at Sunderland, County Durham, United Kingdom. Her crew were rescued. She was on a voyage from Brake to Sunderland.
Notaris van Borken	Kingdom of Hanover	The ship foundered off the Calf of Man, Isle of Man. Her crew survived. She was on a voyage from Glasgow, Renfrewshire to Liverpool, Lancashire, United Kingdom.
Ocean Chief	(United Kingdom of Great Britain and Ireland) New South Wales	The ship was driven ashore at the mouth of the Fitzroy River, Victoria and was severely damaged. She was later refloated and taken in to Sydney for repairs.
Swift	United Kingdom	The ship was wrecked on the coast of County Kerry. Her crew were rescued. She was on a voyage from Tralee to Dingle.

== 18 March ==
List of shipwrecks: 18 March 1863
Ship	State	Description
Anita	Spain	The schooner was driven against the breakwater at Barcelona and was wrecked.
Annie	United Kingdom	The Mersey Flat ran aground in the Hilbre Islands, Cheshire. She was refloated the next day.
Betsey	United Kingdom	The schooner ran aground on the Doom Bar. Her crew were rescued by the Padstow Lifeboat Albert Edward (United Kingdom).
Helena	United Kingdom	The ketch foundered off the Eddystone Lighthouse, Cornwall. Her four crew were rescued by the smack John Hooper (United Kingdom). Helena was on a voyage from Newport, Monmouthshire to Portsmouth, Hampshire.
James Williams	United Kingdom	The brig heeled over and partly sank at Bordeaux, Gironde, France.
Jantina Gezina	Bremen	The schooner was driven ashore and wrecked at Sunderland, County Durham, United Kingdom. She was on a voyage from Bremerhaven to Sunderland.
Marie Rosalie	France	The brigantine was wrecked at Mogador, Morocco.
Nord	Norway	The brig ran aground and was severely damaged at North Shields, Northumberland, United Kingdom. She was on a voyage from Grimstad to North Shields. She was refloated and towed in to North Shields.
Pandema	United Kingdom	The brigantine ran aground on the Doom Bar. Her crew were rescued by the Padstow Lifeboat Albert Edward (United Kingdom).
Pelham	United Kingdom	The collier, a steamship, ran aground on Scroby Sands, Norfolk and was damaged. She was refloated and taken in tow by a tug.

== 19 March ==
List of shipwrecks: 19 March 1863
Ship	State	Description
Freeman	United Kingdom	The schooner foundered in the English Channel with the loss of all hands.
CSS Georgiana	Confederate States Navy	American Civil War, Union blockade: Operating as a blockade runner with a cargo of merchandise, ammunition, cannons, Pattern 1853 Enfield rifle muskets, swords, military supplies, and gold, the 580-ton screw steamer was badly damaged by the gunboat USS Wissahickon (United States Navy) and deliberately run aground on Long Island, South Carolina. Her entire crew and all of her passengers escaped. Sailors from Wissahickon then boarded her and set her on fire to prevent her recapture by Confederate forces. She burned for several days, suffering several explosions.
Jura	United Kingdom	The steamship ran aground on the Little Burbo Bank, in Liverpool Bay. She was on a voyage from Portland, Maine, United States to Liverpool, Lancashire. She was refloated and taken in to Liverpool.
Volumnia	United Kingdom	The ship struck the Paternoster Rocks and foundered. Her crew were rescued. She was on a voyage from Sunderland, County Durham to Swinemünde, Prussia.

== 20 March ==
List of shipwrecks: 20 March 1863
Ship	State	Description
Citizen	United Kingdom	The Yorkshire Billyboy struck the wreck of Yarborough (United Kingdom) and sank off the coast of Lincolnshire. Her crew were rescued by the smack Eliza (United Kingdom). Citizen was on a voyage from Newcastle upon Tyne, Northumberland to London.
Hanover	Hamburg	The ship ran aground off Hooghly Point, India. She was on a voyage from Calcutta, India to Hamburg. She was refloated and taken in to Diamond Harbour.
Lucy Neale	United Kingdom	The ship was lost near the Corsewall Lighthouse, Wigtownshire. Her crew were rescued.
Margaret	United Kingdom	The ship was lost near the Corsewall Lighthouse with the loss of all hands.
Martha Elliot	United Kingdom	The ship was driven ashore and wrecked at Jaffa, Ottoman Syria. Her crew were rescued.

== 21 March ==
List of shipwrecks: 21 March 1863
Ship	State	Description
Arabella	United Kingdom	The ship capsized at Cape Town, Cape Colony.
Blucher	Kingdom of Hanover)	The schooner ran aground and capsized in the River Shannon. She was on a voyage from Venice, Kingdom of Lombardy–Venetia to "Clare", Ireland. She was severely damaged.
Henry	United Kingdom	The ship ran aground at Kingstown, County Dublin. She was on a voyage from Callao, Peru to Kingstown. She was refloated.
Staffordshire	United Kingdom	The ship ran aground in the Hooghly River. She was on a voyage from Liverpool, Lancashire to Calcutta, India. She had been refloated by 23 March.
William and John	United Kingdom	The ship was driven ashore and wrecked at Staithes, Yorkshire. Her crew were rescued.

== 22 March ==
List of shipwrecks: 22 March 1863
Ship	State	Description
Bio Bio	United States	The 822-ton sidewheel paddle steamer burned at New Orleans, Louisiana, Confederate States of America.
Esker	United Kingdom	The schooner was run into and sunk by the schooner Dart (United Kingdom) 6 nautical miles (11 km) north east by north of the Happisburgh Lighthouse, Norfolk. Her crew were rescued by Dart and Mary (United Kingdom). Esker was on a voyage from Hartlepool, County Durham to Colchester, Essex.
Hants	United Kingdom	The brig was driven ashore at Galatea Point, Ottoman Empire. She was on a voyage from South Shields, County Durham to Constantinople, Ottoman Empire. She was refloated.
Newcastle	United Kingdom	The paddle steamer was run into by the brig Mathilda (Kingdom of Hanover) in the River Tyne and was severely damaged. Her 30 passengers were taken off by Mathilda and landed at South Shields, County Durham.
Research	United Kingdom	The ship ran aground at Belfast, County Antrim. She was on a voyage from Maryport, Cumberland to Belfast. She was then run into by the steamship Aurora (United Kingdom) and was damaged. She was refloated and docked.

== 23 March ==
List of shipwrecks: 23 March 1863
Ship	State	Description
Ajax	United Kingdom	The steamship was damaged by an explosion in her aft hold whilst on a voyage from Cardiff, Glamorgan to Liverpool, Lancashire. Four of her crew were severely injured. She put in to Milford Haven, Pembrokeshire.
Baden	United States	The full-rigged ship ran aground in the River Tyne. She was on a voyage from South Shields, County Durham, United Kingdom to Aden. She was refloated and found to be leaky. Subsequently repaired.
Caspian	United Kingdom	The brig was driven ashore near the Kullen Lighthouse, Sweden. She was on a voyage from Blyth, Northumberland to Copenhagen, Denmark.
Emma	Confederate States of America	American Civil War:The Schooner was captured by boats from USS Amanda (United States Navy) at the Mouth of the Ocklockonee River in Apalachee Bay. She ran aground and was burned.
James	United Kingdom	The brig was driven ashore and wrecked at Thisted, Denmark. Her crew were rescued. She was on a voyage from South Shields to Lübeck.
J. and L. Brown	(United Kingdom of Great Britain and Ireland) British North America	The ship was abandoned in the Atlantic Ocean. Her crew were rescued by City of Boston (United States). J. and L. Brown was on a voyage from Glasgow, Renfrewshire to Yarmouth, Nova Scotia.
Kingfisher	United States	American Civil War, CSS Alabama's South Atlantic Expeditionary Raid: The 120-ton whaler, a schooner with a crew of 23, was captured and burned in the South Atlantic Ocean (01°26′S 26°30′W) by the screw sloop-of-war CSS Alabama (Confederate States Navy).
Myrtle	United Kingdom	The brig ran aground on the Newcombe Sand, in the North Sea off the coast of Suffolk. She was refloated and resumed her voyage.
Novar, and Susan and Isabella	United Kingdom	The ships collided in the River Tay and both sank. Novar was on a voyage from Newcastle upon Tyne, Northumberland to Dundee, Forfarshire. Susan and Isabella was on a voyage from Sunderland to Dundee.
Prince Regent	United Kingdom	The ship ran aground and was damaged at Alicante, Spain. She was on a voyage from Hull, Yorkshire to Hull. She was refloated on 7 April and found to be severely leaky. Prince Regent was consequently condemned.

== 24 March ==
List of shipwrecks: 23 March 1863
Ship	State	Description
Christian	United Kingdom	The ship ran aground on the Out Carr Rocks, off the coast of Northumberland. She was on a voyage from the River Tyne to Aberdeen. She was refloated on 27 March.
Cicero	United Kingdom	The ship struck rocks off Rörö, Sweden and was beached at "Knuppla" or "Kaippia". She was on a voyage from Sunderland, County Durham to Swinemünde, Prussia.
Comely	United Kingdom	The ship ran aground at "Kohl Point", Denmark. She floated off and sank. She was on a voyage from Blyth, Northumberland to Landskrona, Sweden.
Emma	Flag unknown	American Civil War, Union blockade: Under the control of a United States Navy prize crew, the 70-ton schooner ran aground near the mouth of the Ocklockonee River in Apalachee Bay and was burned to prevent her recapture by Confederate forces. She had been captured on 23 March by a boat expedition from the barque USS Amanda (United States Navy).
Employ	United Kingdom	The brig ran aground and sank off Skagen, Denmark. Her crew were rescued by Elizabeth Jane (United Kingdom). Employ was on a voyage from Newcastle upon Tyne, Northumberland to Copenhagen, Denmark.
Jupiter	United Kingdom	The ship caught fire and was scuttled in the Victoria Dock, London. She was on a voyage from Sunderland, County Durham to the Cape of Good Hope, Cape Colony. She was refloated
Mercurio	Spain	The steamship was driven ashore and wrecked on Peñon de Vé de la Gomera. All on board were rescued.

== 25 March ==
List of shipwrecks: 25 March 1863
Ship	State	Description
Charles Hill	United States	American Civil War, CSS Alabama's South Atlantic Expeditionary Raid: The 699-ton full-rigged ship, carrying a cargo of salt from Liverpool, Lancashire, United Kingdom, to Montevideo, Uruguay, was captured and burned in the North Atlantic Ocean off the coast of Brazil near the equator at 01°23′N 26°30′W by the screw sloop-of-war CSS Alabama (Confederate States Navy).
Dynameme	United Kingdom	The brig foundered off Cartagena, Spain. She was on a voyage from Port Talbot, Glamorgan to Alexandria, Egypt.
Gipsy King	United Kingdom	The schooner was driven ashore near Inverkip, Renfrewshire. She was on a voyage from Glasgow, Renfrewshire to Liverpool, Lancashire. She was refloated and put back to Glasgow.
Jane	United Kingdom	The ship foundered in the Baltic Sea 25 nautical miles (46 km) west of Skagen, Denmark. Hew crew were rescued. She was on a voyage from South Shields, County Durham to Lübeck.
USS Lancaster	United States Navy	American Civil War: The sidewheel ram was sunk by Confederate artillery in the Mississippi River off Port Hudson, Louisiana, Confederate States of America.
Nora	United States	American Civil War, CSS Alabama's South Atlantic Expeditionary Raid: The schooner, carrying a cargo of salt from Liverpool, to Calcutta, India, was captured and burned in the South Atlantic Ocean (1°12′49″S 26°32′45″W) by the screw sloop-of-war CSS Alabama (Confederate States Navy).
Star of the South	United Kingdom	The ship was destroyed by fire at Barbados. She was on a voyage from Bombay, India to Liverpool, Lancashire.

== 26 March ==
List of shipwrecks: 26 March 1863
Ship	State	Description
Adelayda	Unknown	The Schooner ran ground on Elbow Reef, Florida and was wrecked.
Arma Mela	Kingdom of Hanover	The galiot was wrecked. She was on a voyage from Sunderland, County Durham, United Kingdom to Danzig.
Emden	United Kingdom	The schooner ran aground off the coast of Northumberland.
Enerton	Flag unknown	The ship was wrecked in Moreton Bay, Queensland.
Europa	Prussia	The barque was driven ashore near Dragør, Denmark. She was on a voyage from Rugenwalde to Sunderland.
Goldfinder	United Kingdom	The ship was driven ashore and wrecked at Scotstown Head, Aberdeenshire. Her crew were rescued by pilot boats. She was on a voyage from Newcastle upon Tyne, Northumberland to Dublin.
Isabella and John Buchan	United Kingdom	The ship ran aground at Rønne, Denmark. She was on a voyage from Leith, Lothian to Danzig. She was refloated and resumed her voyage.
Janet	United Kingdom	The sloop foundered in the North Sea off Peterhead, Aberdeenshire. Her three crew were rescued by the steamship Arcturus (Denmark). Janet was on a voyage from Inverness to Leith, Lothian.
Sharon's Rose	United Kingdom	The brig ran aground at Rønne, Denmark. She was on a voyage from Hartlepool, County Durham to Danzig. She was refloated on 10 April and taken in to Rønne for repairs.
Surprise	United Kingdom	The ship foundered. She was on a voyage from Cádiz, Spain to Reval, Russia.

== 27 March ==
List of shipwrecks: 27 March 1863
Ship	State	Description
Anna Meta	Danzig	The ship was wrecked on Bornholm, Denmark. She was on a voyage from Sunderland, County Durham, United Kingdom to Danzig.
Galatea	Stettin	The ship was driven ashore at "Robertknout", Denmark. Her crew were rescued. She was on a voyage from Stettin to Sunderland. She subsequently capsized.
Gezina	Netherlands	The koff was wrecked at "Raagelen", Denmark. Her crew were rescued, She was on a voyage from Newcastle upon Tyne, Northumberland, United Kingdom to Libava, Courland Governorate.
Phœnician	United Kingdom	The brig was driven ashore and wrecked 7 nautical miles (13 km) east of Stettin.
Resolution	United Kingdom	The schooner foundered in the North Sea off Covehithe, Suffolk. Her crew were rescued. She was on a voyage from Middlesbrough, Yorkshire to Calais, France.

== 28 March ==
List of shipwrecks: 28 March 1863
Ship	State	Description
Dreadnought	United Kingdom	The collier, a three-masted schooner, was driven ashore at the mouth of the River Mersey. Her crew were rescued by the Hoylake and New Brighton Lifeboats. She was on a voyage from Cardiff, Glamorgan to Liverpool, Lancashire. She was refloated on 2 April and taken in to Liverpool.
Fanny Ann	United Kingdom	The schooner was driven ashore at Greenore Point, County Louth. She was on a voyage from the Clyde to Tralee, County Kerry.
Globe, Lufton, and Mein Denha	United Kingdom	The schooner Mein Denha ran aground on the Goodwin Sands, Kent. The galley punt Lufton went to their rescue, but struck the schooner and sank. Her ten crew got aboard Mein Denha. The galley punt Globe rescued all on board, but was subsequently abandoned in a sinking condition. All 26 people on board were rescued by the lugger Garland (United Kingdom). Mein Denha was on a voyage from Cardiff, Glamorgan to Leith, Lothian.
Heatherbell	United Kingdom	The ship was driven ashore and wrecked at "Gronhol", Denmark. Her crew were rescued. She was on a voyage from Dysart, Fife to Griefswald.
Maja	Prussia	The ship was wrecked at Thisted, Denmark. She was on a voyage from Montrose, Forfarshire, United Kingdom to Memel.
Meridina	United Kingdom	The ship ran aground on the Goodwin Sands, Kent and was wrecked. She was on a voyage from Cardiff, Glamorgan to Leith, Lothian.
Tuscan	United Kingdom	The ship ran aground on the Owers Sandbank, in the English Channel off the coast of Sussex. She was on a voyage from Newcastle upon Tyne, Northumberland to Alicante, Spain. She was refloated and taken in to Portsmouth, Hampshire in a leaky condition.
Wasp	United Kingdom	The brigantine was driven ashore and sank at the mouth of the River Mersey. Her crew were rescued by the Hoylake and New Brighton Lifeboats. She was on a voyage from Newport, Monmouthshire to Liverpool.

== 29 March ==
List of shipwrecks: 29 March 1863
Ship	State	Description
Aalto	Russia	The full-rigged ship was wrecked at Cape San Antonio, Cuba. She was on a voyage from Hull, Yorkshire, United Kingdom to Matanzas, Cuba.
Absalom	(United Kingdom of Great Britain and Ireland) New South Wales	The ketch was wrecked without loss of life on the South Spit at the Heads while attempting to exit the Macleay River in New South Wales. She and her cargo were a total loss.
CSS Vicksburg	Confederate States of America	American Civil War: The 635-ton sidewheel paddle steamer, lacking her machinery and serving as a wharf boat at Vicksburg, Mississippi, caught fire, broke free of her moorings, and drifted down the Mississippi River past Union forces. The fire destroyed her.
Voyager	United Kingdom	The ship was wrecked at Lemvig, Denmark with the loss of her captain. She was on a voyage from Middlesbrough, Yorkshire to Stettin.

== 30 March ==
List of shipwrecks: 30 March 1863
Ship	State	Description
Balder	Norway	The schooner struck the quayside at Sunderland, County Durham, United Kingdom and was severely damaged. She was on a voyage from Drammen to North Shields. She was docked in a waterlogged condition. Subsequently placed under repair.'
M. J. Colcord	United States	American Civil War: The barque, carrying a cargo of provisions from New York to Cape Town, Cape Colony was captured and burned in the Atlantic Ocean by the screw sloop-of-war CSS Florida (Confederate States Navy).
Trojan	United Kingdom	The barque caught fire at Cowes, Isle of Wight.

== 31 March ==
List of shipwrecks: 31 March 1863
Ship	State	Description
Active	United Kingdom	The schooner struck a sunken rock and was beached on Islay, Inner Hebrides. She was on a voyage from Runcorn, Cheshire to Wick, Caithness. She was refloated and found to be severely leaky. She proceeded with extra hands the next day but was consequently beached at Corpach, Inverness-shire, where the leak was repaired. She arrived at Wick on 9 April.
Auspicious	United Kingdom	The brig was wrecked on a reef off Borkum, Kingdom of Hanover with the loss of all hands. She was on a voyage from North Shields, Northumberland to Hamburg.
Jonge Pieter	Netherlands	The barque was wrecked on Læsø, Denmark. She was on a voyage from Newcastle upon Tyne, Northumberland to Skive, Denmark.
Trym	United Kingdom	The ship was driven ashore at Cowes, Isle of Wight.

== Unknown date ==
List of shipwrecks: Unknown date in March 1863
Ship	State	Description
Bon Jules	France	The ship foundered off Belle Île, Morbihan. She was on a voyage from Cardiff, Glamorgan, United Kingdom to Nantes, Loire-Inférieure.
Dart	United Kingdom	The ship was wrecked near St. Davids, Pembrokeshire. She was on a voyage from Barrow in Furness, Lancashire to Havre de Grâce, Seine-Inférieure, France.
Despatch	(United Kingdom of Great Britain and Ireland) Guernsey	The ship foundered in the Atlantic Ocean 8 nautical miles (15 km) north east of Madeira. Her twelve crew took to three boats. Six of them in one boat reached the Canary Islands on 24 March. Despatch was on a voyage from Huelva, Spain to Newcastle upon Tyne, Northumberland.
Early Morn	United Kingdom	The barque was driven ashore at the mouth of the Buffalo River, Cape Colony.
Emily Fisher	United States	The ship was captured by CSS Retribution (Confederate States Navy) and run ashore in the Bahamas.
Emma	United Kingdom	The ship was driven ashore near Newry, County Antrim.
Freeman	United Kingdom	The brigantine foundered off Lands End, Cornwall with the loss of all hands.
Gipsy	(United Kingdom of Great Britain and Ireland) New Zealand	The schooner ran aground while trying to enter the mouth of the Buller River towards the end of March. Two lives were lost due to the capsizing of a canoe during the rescue of the crew.
Jeune Martha	France	The ship was wrecked near Bilbao, Spain. She was on a voyage from Cardiff to Bilbao.
Lord Raglan	United Kingdom	The ship was presumed to have been destroyed by fire in the Atlantic Ocean between 24 and 26 March with the loss of all 354 people on board. She was on a voyage from Liverpool, Lancashire to Melbourne, Victoria.
Mary	United Kingdom	The ship was wrecked at Santander, Spain. She was on a voyage from Plymouth, Devon to Gijón, Spain.
Mississippi	United Kingdom	The ship was driven ashore and wrecked at Garrucha, Spain.
Natalina	Austrian Empire	The barque was wrecked at Monastir, Beylik of Tunis.
Resolution	United Kingdom	The ship ran aground on the Longsand in the North Sea. She was refloated and taken in to King's Lynn, Norfolk.
Ripple	United Kingdom	The ship was wrecked at "Ara Nova", Spain before 6 March.
Star of the West	Confederate States of America	American Civil War, Vicksburg Campaign: The paddle steamer, also referred to as CSS St. Philip, was scuttled as a blockship in the Tallahatchie River near Greenwood, Mississippi.
Unknown	Confederate States of America	American Civil War:The Schooner was burned in the Ochlockonee River by Union forces March 2–4.
Young Harry	United States	Bound for Matamoros, Mexico, with a cargo of flour, clothes, and other goods, the brig was wrecked on the coast of Texas, Confederate States of America, 6 nautical miles (11 km) from the mouth of the Rio Grande.
