= USS Braziliera =

Gunboat of the United States Navy

History

United States
- Name: USS Braziliera
- Laid down: date unknown
- Launched: 1856 at Baltimore, Maryland
- Acquired: July 30, 1861
- Commissioned: October 27, 1861
- Decommissioned: 1865
- Stricken: 1865 (est.)
- Fate: Sold, June 2, 1865

General characteristics
- Type: Bark
- Tonnage: 541
- Length: 135 ft 8 in (41.35 m)
- Beam: 28 ft 7 in (8.71 m)
- Draft: 10 ft (3.0 m)
- Propulsion: Sail
- Speed: 10 kn (12 mph; 19 km/h)
- Complement: Unknown
- Armament: 6 × 32-pounder smoothbore guns

USS Braziliera was a bark acquired by the Union Navy during the American Civil War. She was used by the Union Navy primarily as a gunboat stationed off Confederate ports to prevent their trading with foreign countries.

== Built in Baltimore, Maryland, in 1861 ==
Braziliera — a wooden bark — was built in 1856 by J. J. Abrahams, Baltimore, Maryland; purchased at New York City on July 30, 1861; and commissioned on October 27, 1861, Acting Volunteer Lieutenant C. F. W. Behm in command.

== Civil War service ==
=== Assigned to the North Atlantic Blockade ===
She joined the North Atlantic Blockading Squadron and served on the blockade of Beaufort, North Carolina. On March 3, 1862, Braziliera received considerable damage when the bark Amanda dragged anchor at Hampton Roads, Virginia, and collided with her.

=== Reassigned to the South Atlantic Blockade ===
On June 27, Braziliera reported to the South Atlantic Blockading Squadron. While with the Squadron she captured four vessels. She also took part in the destruction of salt works on St. Simon's Sound, Georgia, and lumberworks on St. Andrew Bay, Florida.

In May 1864, she assisted in defeating the attack of CSS North Carolina at the mouth of the Cape Fear River, North Carolina.

== Post-war decommissioning and sale ==
Braziliera was sold on June 2, 1865, at Philadelphia, Pennsylvania.
