= USS Brockenborough =

US ship in its Civil War

History

United States
- Name: USS Brockenborough
- Ordered: as G. L. Brockenborough
- Acquired: November 15, 1862
- In service: 1862
- Out of service: May 27, 1863
- Stricken: 1863 (est.)
- Captured: by Union Navy forces October 16, 1862
- Fate: Sunk, May 27, 1863

General characteristics
- Type: Ship's tender / gunboat
- Propulsion: Sail
- Speed: varied
- Complement: 4
- Armament: 1 × rifled howitzer

USS Brockenborough was a sloop captured by the Union Navy during the American Civil War.

She was used by the Union Navy primarily as a ship's tender and also as a gunboat stationed off Confederate ports to enforce the Union blockade which prevented trade with foreign countries.

Brockenborough was wrecked in a storm and her crew burned her to prevent capture.

== Capture of Brockenborough ==
On October 16, 1862, the commanding officer of the Union steamer Fort Henry — Acting Lieutenant Edward Y. McCauley — ordered Acting Master Robert B. Smith to lead a reconnaissance expedition up the Apalachicola River. During the ensuing operation, Smith's boats exchanged fire with Southerners ashore and signaled Sagamore for help. That gunboat's launch brought a howitzer into the fray, "…cleared the banks of the guerrillas," and enabled the Union boats to continue on upstream. A short distance past the town of Apalachicola, Florida, Smith found a sailing ship which had grounded inside the mouth of a creek. She proved to be G. L. Brockenborough, a sloop carrying 64 bales of cotton. Her master and a single passenger were still on board. The Union sailors refloated the vessel and took her to Key West, Florida, where she was condemned by the prize court and purchased by the Navy on November 15.

== Civil War service ==
Sent back to waters off the Apalachicola, Brockenborough — also spelled Brockenboro — served the East Gulf Blockading Squadron as a tender to the double-ended sidewheeler Port Royal and the former ferryboat Somerset.

On February 18, 1863, while anchored off New Inlet, St. George's Sound, Somerset sighted a schooner sailing westward along the southern coast of St. George's Island; and her captain — Lieutenant Commander A. F. Crosman — sent Brockenborough in pursuit. She overtook and captured Hortense, a schooner bound from Havana, Cuba, for Mobile, Alabama, with an escorted cargo. Crosman manned the prize from Somerset and sent her to Key West, for adjudication, and she was condemned by the prize court there.

On March 20, Acting Volunteer Lieutenant George E. Welch — who commanded the Union bark Amanda — sent his executive officer, Acting Master Richard J. Hoffner, in Brockenborough to the mouth of the Ocklocknee River to investigate a report that a schooner was loading cotton at that place.

The sloop, accompanied by Amanda's launch, struggled across the marshy waters of St. George's Sound for three days before reaching the Ocklocknee where Hoffner found "…a dismasted vessel lying close to [the river's] starboard bank…." While the Union party approached the partially sunken ship, the Southerners who had been on board escaped to shore in boats. Hoffner tried to tow his quarry back toward the sound, but the prize — the schooner Onward — was stranded by the ebbing tide some two hours later.

The next morning, when Onward was again afloat, the expedition once more headed for deep water, but took the wrong channel and again struck the bottom. After strenuously, although futilely, striving to pull free, the Union sailors decided to wait for help from the rising tide. However, a short while later, a Confederate force of about 40 mounted soldiers and 150 infantrymen arrived and attacked the expedition.

Some of the sailors fought back with a howitzer and muskets while their companions set fire to the prize before the whole Union party withdrew in Brockenborough and the launch. Both scraped on the bottom but were kept in motion by wading sailors who dragged the boats for about half a mile over mud flats before they floated free. Confederate riflemen kept the party under fire throughout the retreat, killing one man outright and wounding eight others, including Acting Master Hoffner.

Once the boats were free of the mud, they proceeded to waters off St. Mark's, Florida, where the wounded were embarked in the Union steamer Hendrick Hudson.

Brockenborough soon returned to St. Georges Sound and, some two months later, was within signal distance of USS Port Royal, when boats from that ship captured the cotton-laden sloop Fashion on 23 May.

That night a stiff breeze from the northeast arose and the next day it began to increase steadily in intensity. By 27 May, the wind had reached hurricane intensity and had created a shoreward, 8 kn (9.2 mph; 15 km/h) current through the West Pass in St. George's Sound, threatening to drive Brockenborough ashore on the mainland where she and her crew would be at the mercy of Confederate forces.

On 28 May the sloop was driven ashore by the wind and wrecked on St. George's Island where she was set afire to prevent her being recaptured by the South.
