= 1863 Atlantic hurricane season =

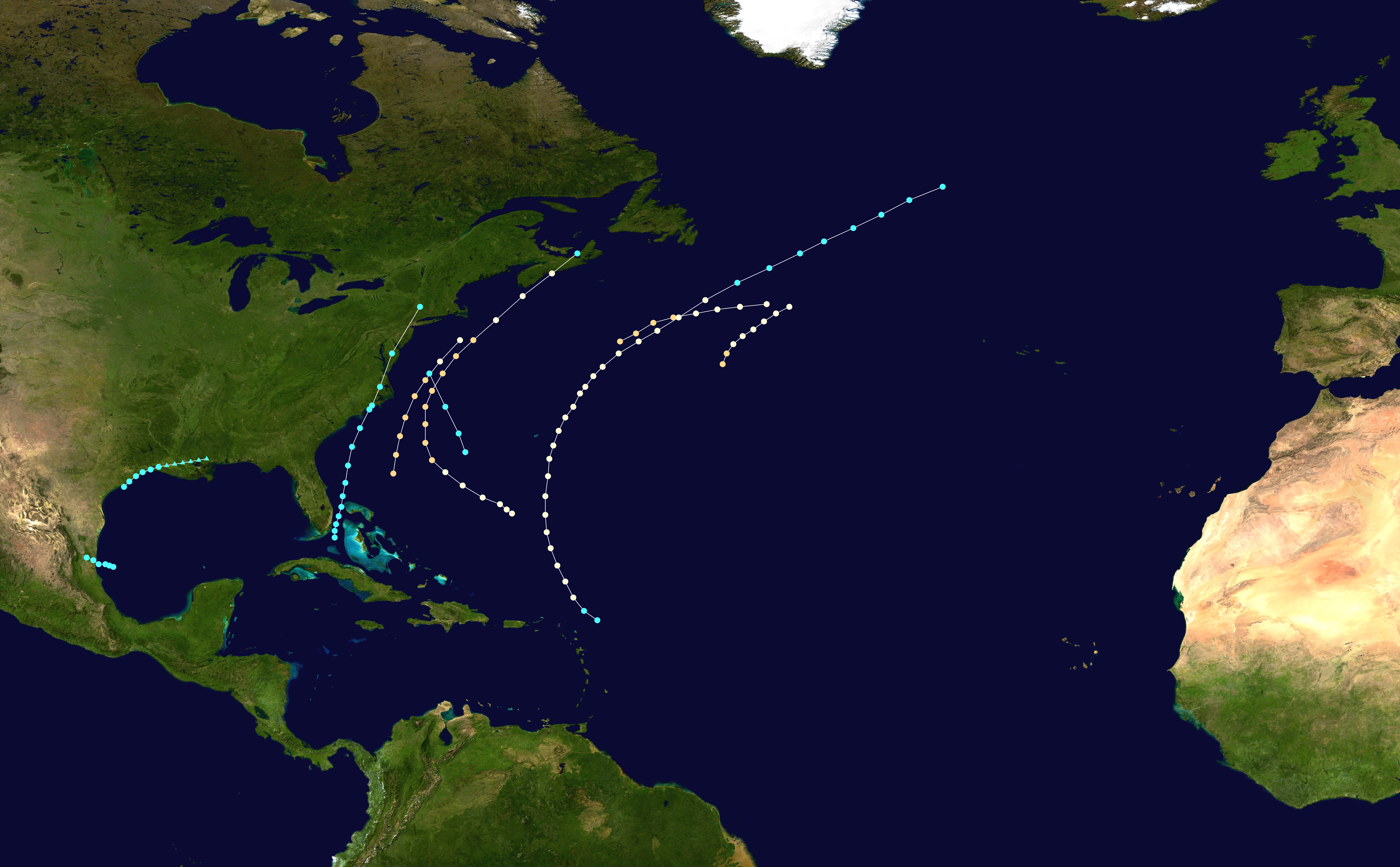
- Season summary map

Seasonal boundaries
- First system formed: May 24, 1863
- Last system dissipated: September 30, 1863

Strongest storm
- Name: One, Two, Three, and Four
  - Maximum winds: 105 mph (165 km/h) (1-minute sustained)

Seasonal statistics
- Total storms: 9 official, 2 unofficial
- Hurricanes: 5 official, 1 unofficial
- Major hurricanes (Cat. 3+): 0
- Total fatalities: 200
- Total damage: Unknown

The 1863 Atlantic hurricane season featured five landfalling tropical cyclones. In the absence of modern satellite and other remote-sensing technologies, only storms that affected populated land areas or encountered ships at sea were recorded, so the actual total could be higher. An undercount bias of zero to six tropical cyclones per year between 1851 and 1885 has been estimated. There were seven recorded hurricanes and no major hurricanes, which are Category 3 or higher on the modern day Saffir–Simpson scale. Of the known 1863 cyclones, seven were first documented in 1995 by José Fernández-Partagás and Henry Diaz, while the ninth tropical storm was first documented in 2003. These changes were largely adopted by the National Oceanic and Atmospheric Administration's Atlantic hurricane reanalysis in their updates to the Atlantic hurricane database (HURDAT), with some adjustments.

Although it is not officially listed in HURDAT, Hurricane "Amanda", named after a ship run aground by the storm, developed in the Gulf of Mexico on May 24. First documented by Edward N. Rappaport and Fernández-Partagás in 1995, the system capsized several other ships and caused damage along the coast of the Florida Panhandle. The cyclone made landfall near Apalachicola, Florida, exceptionally early in the season, on May 28. Amanda is the only known hurricane landfall in the United States in the month of May since HURDAT records began in 1851. On land and at sea, the cyclone left at least 110 fatalities. Few other storms were notable. In August, the third official storm capsized the American brig Bainbridge off Hatteras, North Carolina, drowning 80 people. The seventh official cyclone caused 10 deaths near Tampico, Tamaulipas, after the ship J.K.L. sunk.

== Systems ==
=== Hurricane One ===
- Category 2 hurricane (SSHWS)
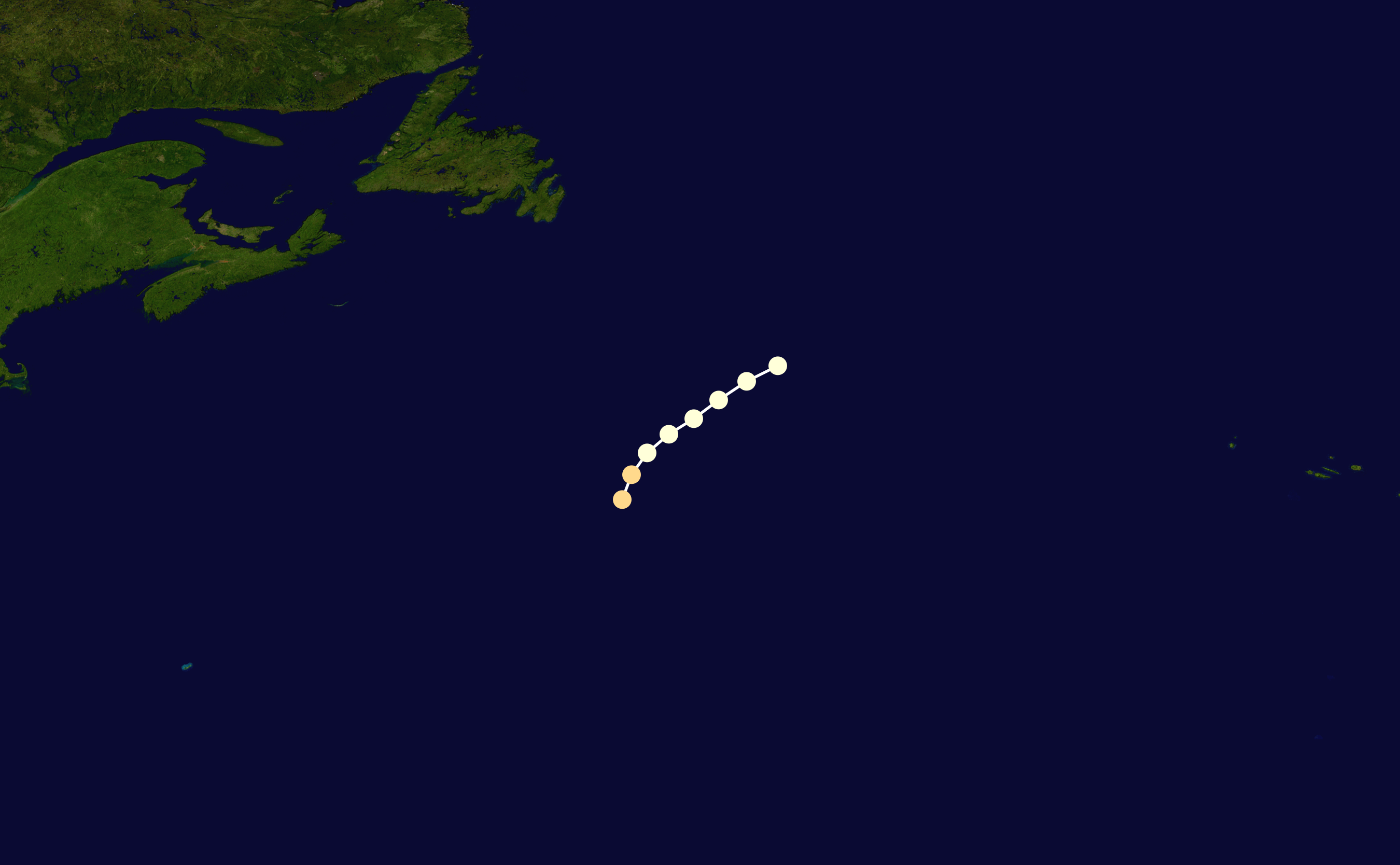
- Duration: August 8 – August 9
- Peak intensity: 105 mph (165 km/h) (1-min);

A Category 2 hurricane was first encountered by the ship Francis B. Cutting about 630 mi (1,010 km) south-southeast of Cape Race, Newfoundland, on August 8. With winds estimated at 105 mph (165 km/h), the storm weakened to a Category 1 hurricane several hours later as it tracked northeastward. The cyclone was last noted late on August 9.

=== Hurricane Two ===
- Category 2 hurricane (SSHWS)
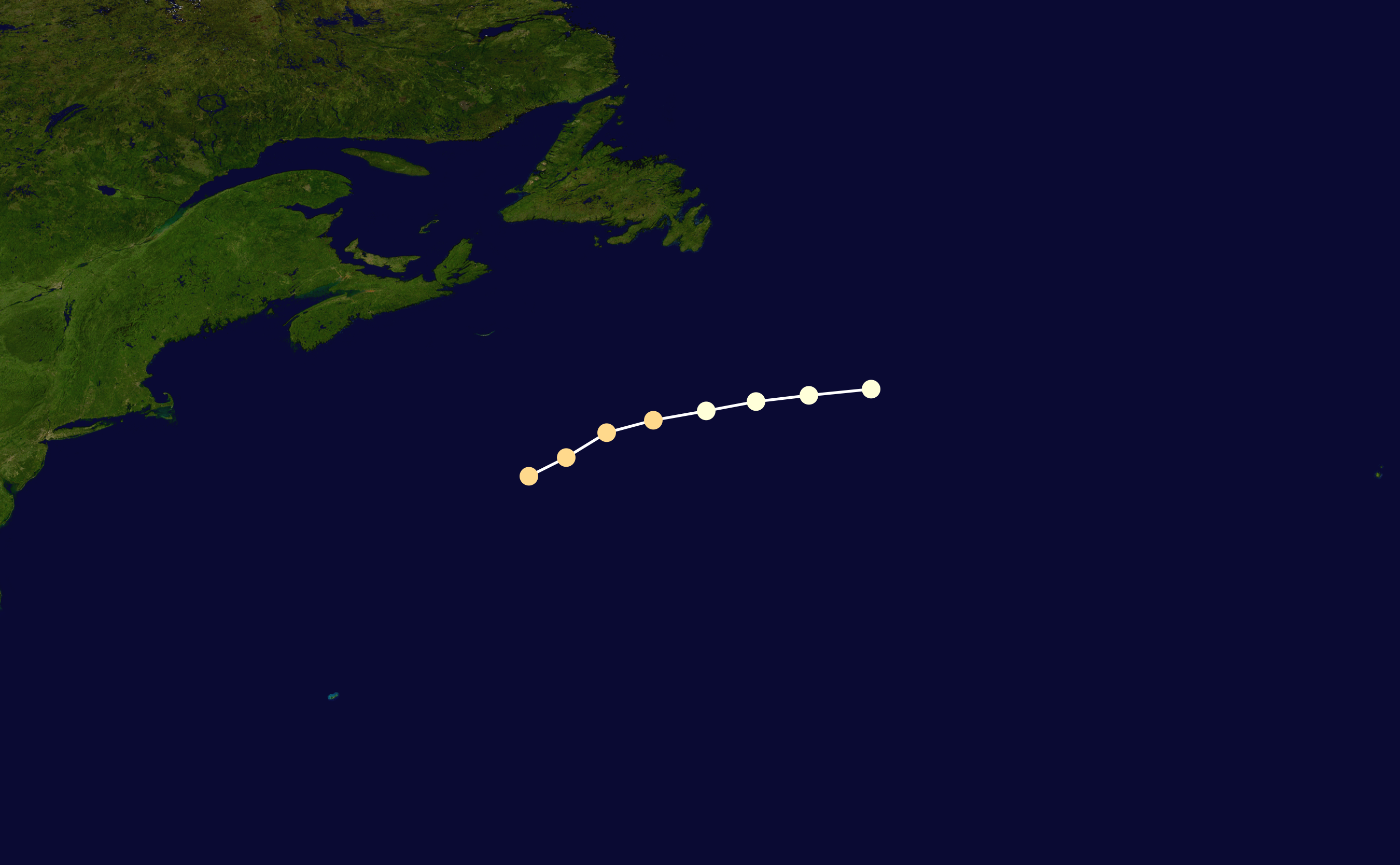
- Duration: August 18 – August 19
- Peak intensity: 105 mph (165 km/h) (1-min);

The ship American Congress first encountered this storm on August 18, about 320 mi (510 km) south-southeast of Sable Island. Reports from American Congress and other ships in the cyclone's path suggest that the storm was a Category 2 hurricane that moved east-northeastward offshore Atlantic Canada between August 18 and August 19. The hurricane caused the loss of the ship B.R. Millam, whose crew transferred to the Thebes, while the Herzogin lost several masts and sails.

=== Hurricane Three ===
- Category 2 hurricane (SSHWS)
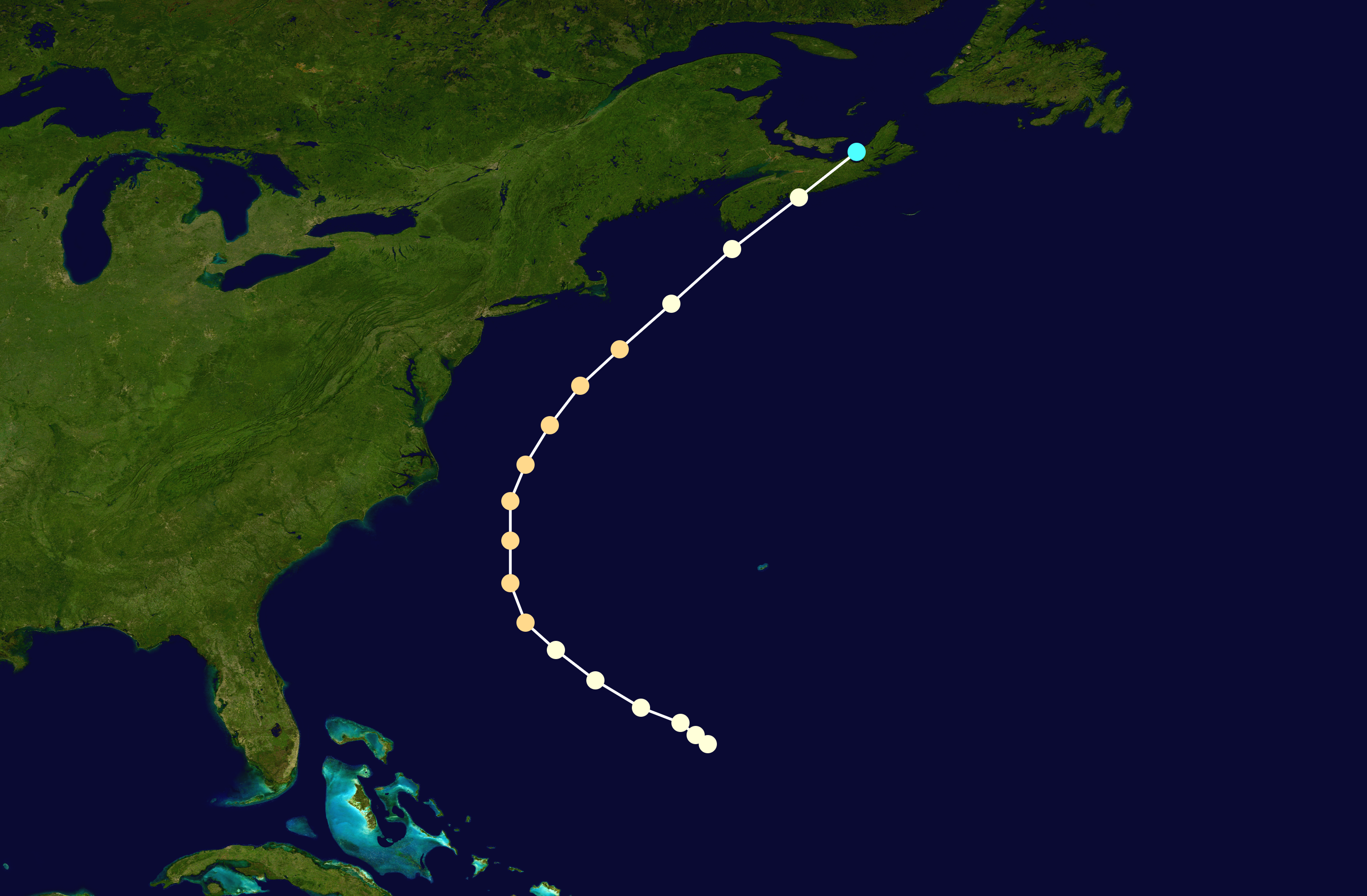
- Duration: August 19 – August 23
- Peak intensity: 105 mph (165 km/h) (1-min); 975 mbar (hPa)

A hurricane was first seen by the ship Addie Barnes on August 19 in the western Atlantic Ocean, about midway between the southeastern Bahamas and Bermuda. It headed northwestward, causing heavy rains and damage to the Outer Banks of North Carolina, but remained offshore. It turned northeastward and made landfall near Dartmouth, Nova Scotia, before transitioning into an extratropical cyclone. Several vessels were struck by the hurricane. The American brig Bainbridge capsized in the storm off Hatteras early on August 21 with the loss of 80 lives. The sole survivor was picked up by the South Boston on the evening of August 22. The ship American Congress encountered this hurricane on August 22 off Georges Bank. On August 23, the Minor was wrecked on the south side of St Paul Island, off the northeastern tip of Nova Scotia. Two ships, including the Ashburton recorded a barometric pressure of 975 mbar (28.8 inHg), the lowest in relation to the storm.

=== Hurricane Four ===
- Category 2 hurricane (SSHWS)
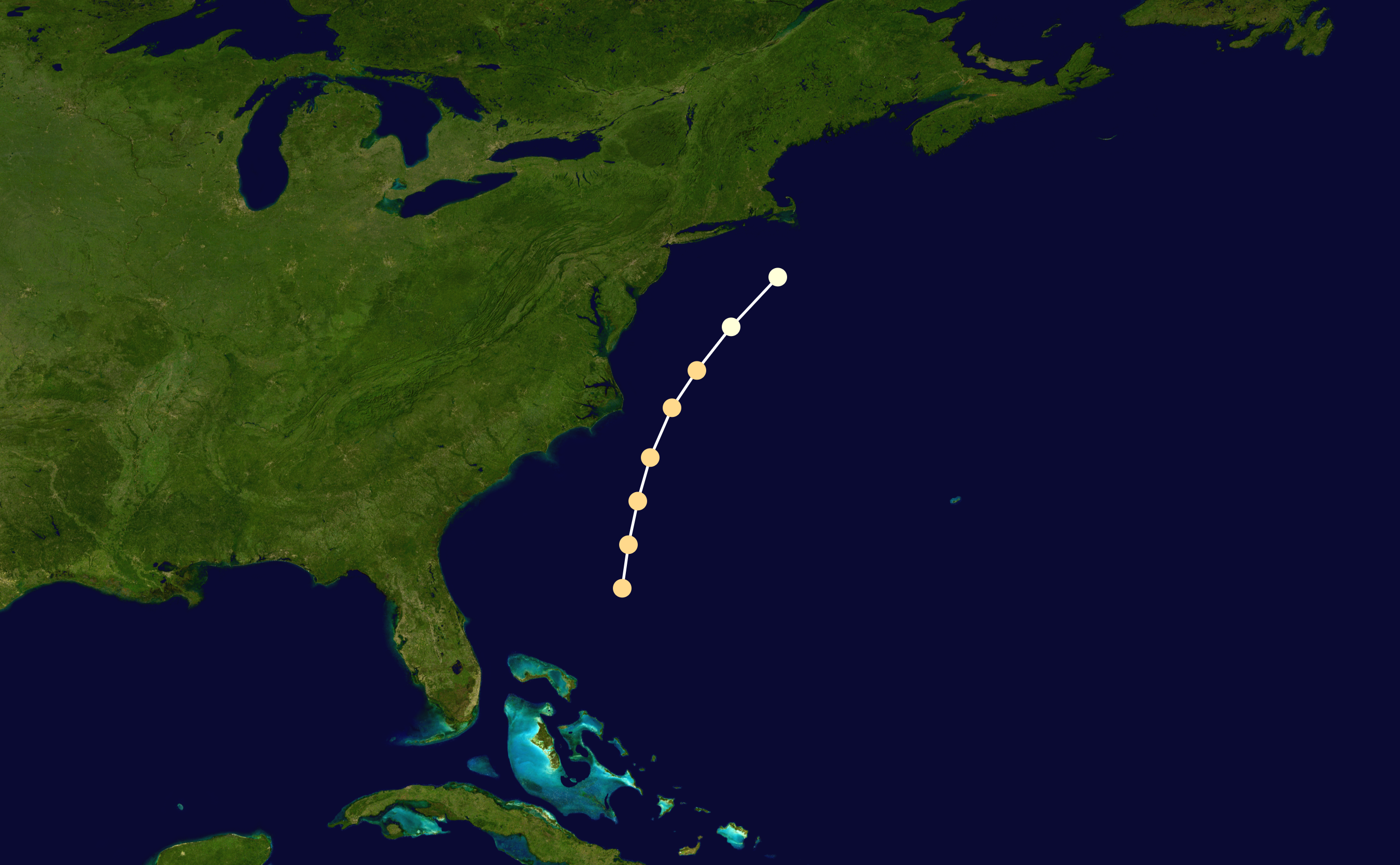
- Duration: August 27 – August 28
- Peak intensity: 105 mph (165 km/h) (1-min);

This hurricane is known from two ship reports. The steamship Dolphin, sailing from Key West to New York City, encountered a hurricane on the night of August 27 and for 18 hours thereafter. Wind reports from the ship suggested that the storm was a Category 2 hurricane winds of 105 mph (165 km/h). The brig Camilla was struck about 200 mi (320 km) from Sandy Hook in New Jersey on August 28 and forced to return to port for repairs. The storm was last noted later that day.

=== Hurricane Five ===
- Category 1 hurricane (SSHWS)
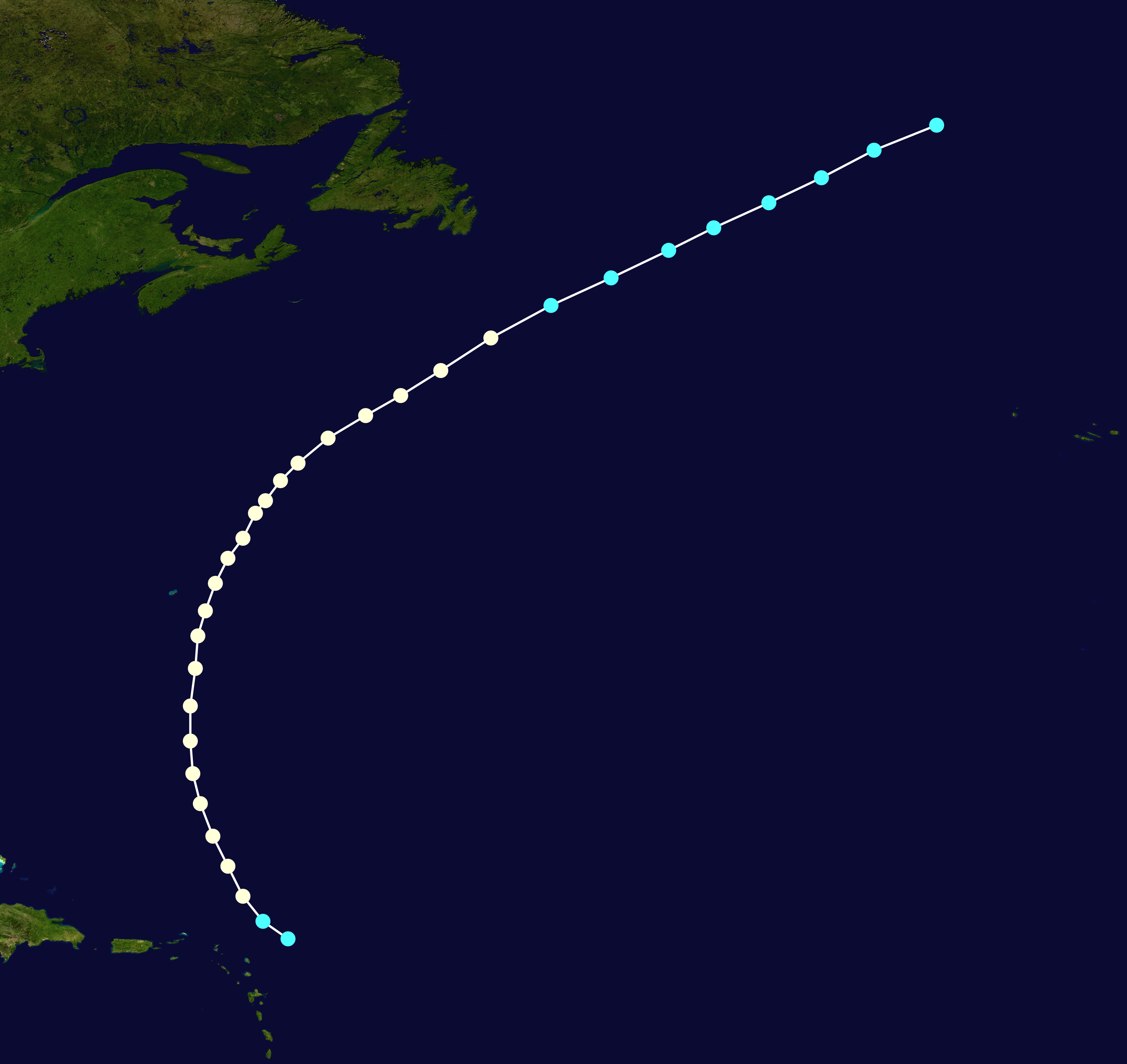
- Duration: September 9 – September 16
- Peak intensity: 80 mph (130 km/h) (1-min);

A tropical storm was initially encountered near the Lesser Antilles on September 9 by the ship Frank W.. Later that day, the ship Mary Ann was dismasted. It is estimated that the cyclone intensified into a Category 1 hurricane around 12:00 UTC on September 9, with winds reaching 80 mph (130 km/h). The system moved north-northwestward or northward for several days and closely approached Bermuda late on September 11. Around that time, some ships to the southeast of the island were damaged during the storm and put into Bermuda as a result. By early on September 13, the hurricane was beginning to move in a more northeasterly direction. The bark Machae was dismasted on September 14. The cyclone weakened to a tropical storm early the following day. On September 16, the Glad Tiding last observed the storm about halfway between Newfoundland and Ireland.

=== Tropical Storm Six ===
- Tropical storm (SSHWS)
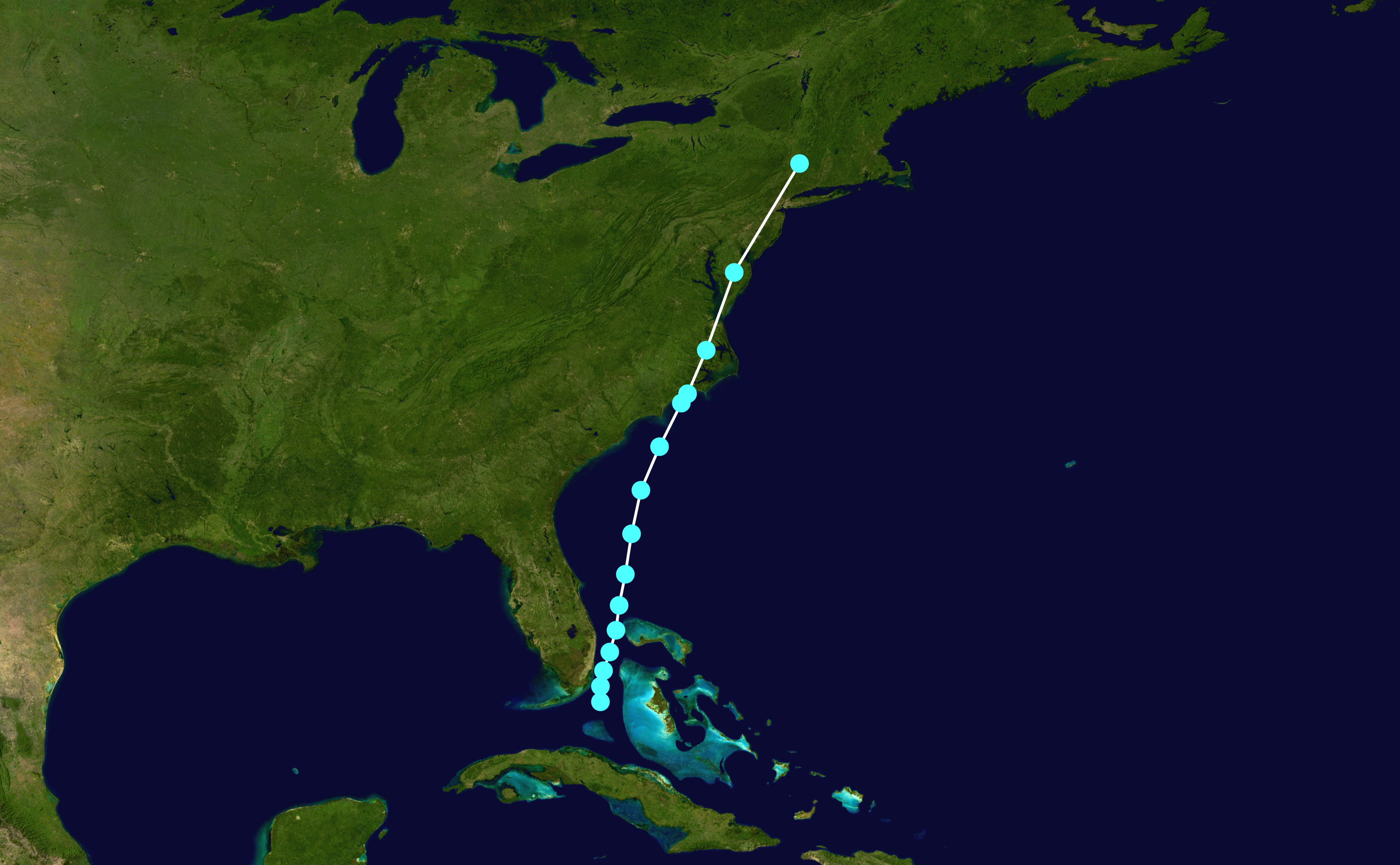
- Duration: September 16 – September 19
- Peak intensity: 70 mph (110 km/h) (1-min);

A tropical storm formed near South Florida on September 16. Later that day, the sloop Eliza was dismantled at Matanilla Reef, about 50 mi (80 km) north of Grand Bahama. Moving north-northeastward, the storm began approaching the Carolinas on September 17. The cyclone intensified and peaked with winds of 70 mph (110 km/h) that same day. Around 13:00 UTC on September 18, the system made landfall in Emerald Isle, North Carolina. Thereafter, the storm tracked rapidly north-northeastward and lost tropical characteristics near the Connecticut–Massachusetts–New York state lines early on September 19.

In South Carolina, strong winds and large waves impacted the Charleston area. A number of homes were destroyed, forcing some occupants to ride out the storm completely exposed to the weather. Waves overtopped the levees, flooding army camps along the coast. On September 18, two schooners were capsized in the Lower Potomac River. Crops were also destroyed in the area, while a railroad bridge was carried away. A ship was demasted off Cove Point in Chesapeake Bay on September 18. Heavy rainfall in Pennsylvania resulted in flooding along the Delaware River and Lehigh Canal, especially in Easton. In Jim Thorpe, then known as Mauch Chunk, three bridges washed away, while a dam was destroyed. In New York City, gale-force winds were observed at harbor.

=== Tropical Storm Seven ===
- Tropical storm (SSHWS)
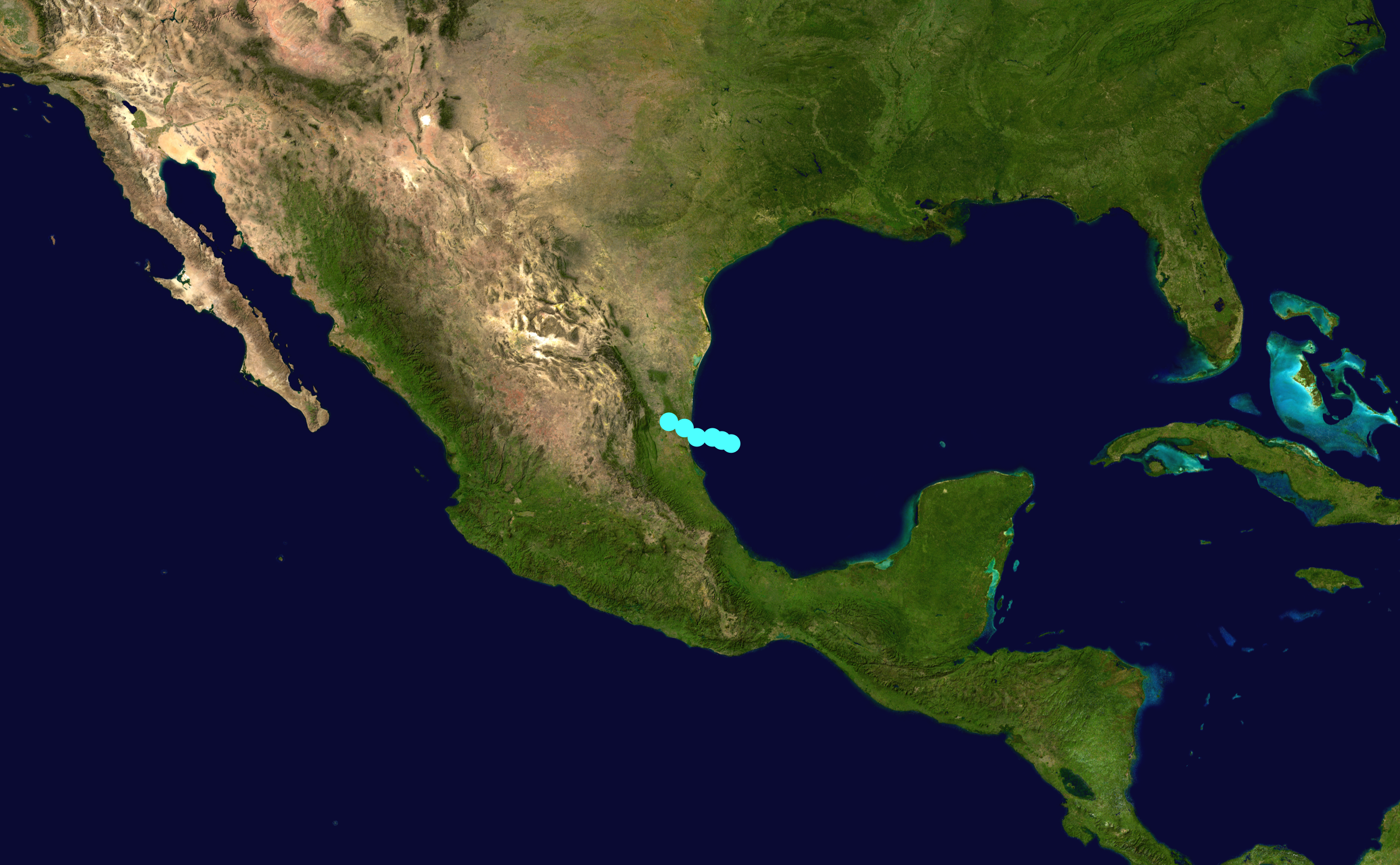
- Duration: September 18 – September 19
- Peak intensity: 60 mph (95 km/h) (1-min);

On September 18, a heavy northern gale wrecked the ship Smoker on the bar at Tampico, Tamaulipas, in Mexico. On September 19, two ships were capsized, the John Howell and the J.K.L. After the latter sunk, 10 people drowned, including the captain. No specific locations are known for these shipwrecks so no complete track for this storm is known, but it was active in the western Gulf of Mexico beginning on September 18. The storm made landfall early on September 19 in a rural area of Tamaulipas to the north of Tampico. Based on John Kaplan and Mark DeMaria's inland decay model created in 1995, it is estimated that the cyclone dissipated several hours later. Climate researcher Michael Chenoweth does not consider this system to have been a tropical cyclone, instead attributing the squally weather to a cold front and high-pressure area.

=== Tropical Storm Eight ===
- Tropical storm (SSHWS)
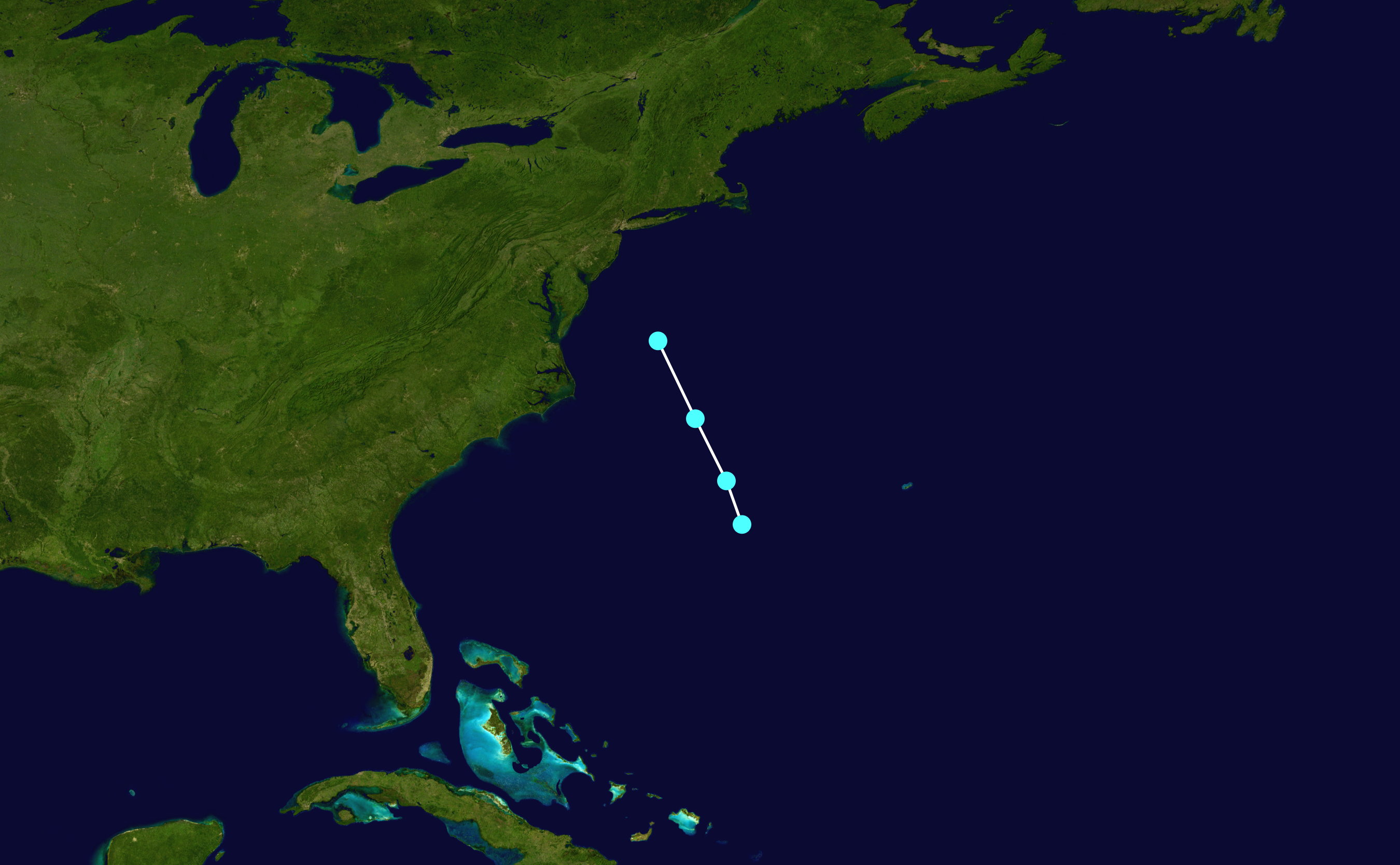
- Duration: September 26 – September 27
- Peak intensity: 60 mph (95 km/h) (1-min);

Three ships reported encountering a tropical storm on September 26 in the western Atlantic, beginning with the Horace E. Bell about 320 mi (510 km) west-southwest of Bermuda. Data from these ships indicated that the storm peaked with winds of 60 mph (95 km/h). The storm moved rapidly north-northwestward and was last noted offshore the Mid-Atlantic early on September 27. Chenoweth also proposed the removal of this storm from HURDAT due to "Insufficient supporting evidence from other neighboring data sources".

=== Tropical Storm Nine ===
- Tropical storm (SSHWS)
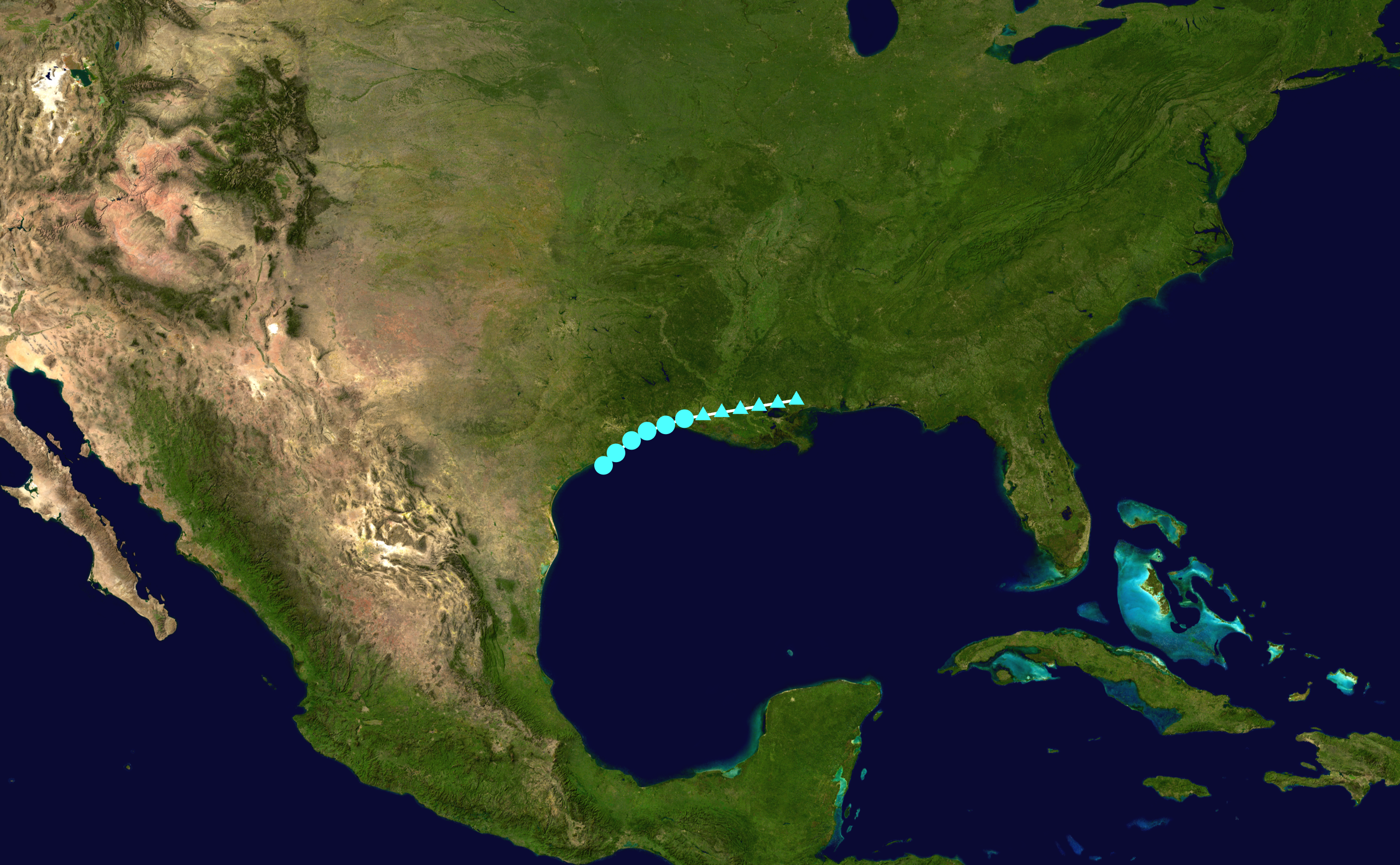
- Duration: September 29 – September 30
- Peak intensity: 70 mph (110 km/h) (1-min); 999 mbar (hPa)

A tropical storm formed offshore southeast Texas on at 00:00 UTC on September 29, though the system exhibited some non-tropical characteristics. Moving northeastward, the cyclone made landfall near Galveston, Texas, about twelve hours later with winds of 70 mph (110 km/h). Around that time, a barometric pressure of 999 mbar (29.5 inHg) was observed in Houston, the lowest pressure in relation to the storm. At 12:00 UTC, the cyclone transitioned into an extratropical cyclone over southwestern Louisiana. The remnants moved north-northeastward until dissipating over southern Mississippi on October 1.

In Texas, strong winds and tree damage occurred at Sabine Pass, where the schooner Manhasett was driven ashore. The Manhasett, a Union ship, was then captured by the Confederates. In Louisiana, heavy rainfall at the Atchafalaya Basin over the course of two and a half days forced Confederate troops to remain at Morgan's Ferry. Rainfall from the storm in New Orleans ended a drought in the city.

=== Other storms ===
==== Hurricane "Amanda" ====
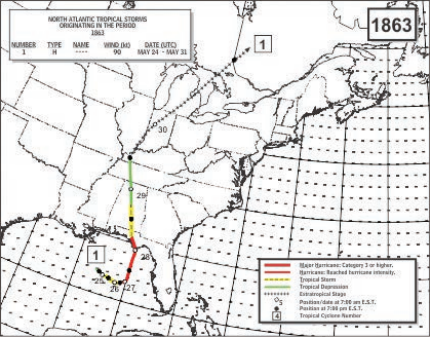
Proposed path of Hurricane "Amanda"

Meteorologists Edward N. Rappaport and José Fernández-Partagás first documented this system in 1995. Based on analysis from Michael Chenoweth and Cary Mock in 2013, a tropical system developed in the Gulf of Mexico on May 24. Named for the USS Amanda, a bark which it drove ashore, the tropical cyclone is estimated to have intensified into a hurricane on May 27. It moved northward and made landfall to the west of Apalachicola, Florida, on May 28. Early that day, Amanda observed a barometric pressure of 975 mbar (28.8 inHg), the lowest in association with the cyclone, and was analyzed by Chenoweth and Mock as a Category 2 hurricane with 105 mph (165 km/h) sustained winds. The storm weakened while moving inland, before accelerating ahead of a cold front and becoming an extratropical cyclone over Kentucky late on May 29. An extratropical low absorbed the remnants of the storm over Quebec on May 31. As delineated by Chenoweth and Mock, Amanda would be the earliest calendar year U.S. landfalling hurricane. However, this storm is not listed in HURDAT2.

Amanda caused heavy damage in the northeast Gulf of Mexico and the Florida Panhandle. In addition to sinking the Amanda, several other ships encountered the storm or were also capsized. At least 38 deaths occurred at sea. In St. Marks, Florida, strong winds destroyed homes and fences, as well as the salt works, ruining about 40,000 bushels of salt. Storm surge inundated crops and the railroad tracks. A total of 40 people and 48 mules and oxen drowned. An additional 32 people drowned at Dickerson Bay and Goose Creek. Some coastal forts were damaged, while tents and equipment used by Confederate troops were lost. In Tallahassee, heavy rainfall and severe gales were reported, damaging homes and other properties. The hurricane caused upward of 110 fatalities.

==== Newfoundland Storm ====
On September 11, the ship North American reported a 'hurricane from SW' at a position that would indicate a storm center just east of Newfoundland. No evidence of a tropical origin for this cyclone has been found.

== See also ==
- Atlantic hurricane
- Atlantic hurricane reanalysis project
- Tropical cyclone observation
